= Huebra =

River in Spain

Coordinates: 41.035°N 6.808°W

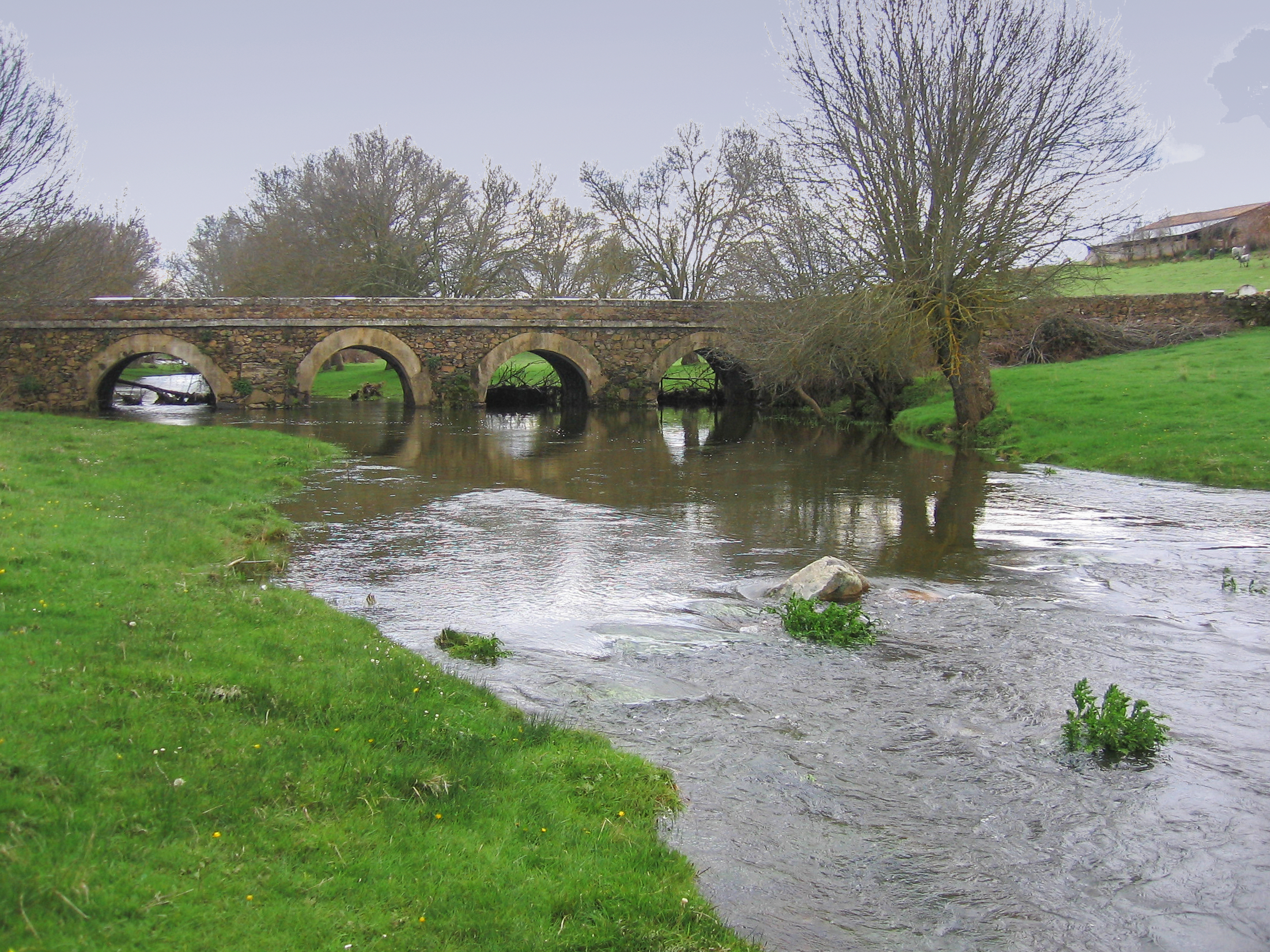

Location
- Country: Spain

Physical characteristics
- Source
  - location: Escurial de la Sierra and Hondura de Huebra
- Mouth
  - location: Duero
- Basin size: 2,881 km^{2} (1,112 sq mi)

The Huebra is a river in Spain, that flows from Escurial de la Sierra (in Salamanca province) to the river Duero. Its tributaries include the Yeltes River and the Tumbafrailes. Its total length is about 123 kilometers (76 miles). The river flows through a series of gorges and canyons, including the Arribes del Huebra Natural Park.

== See also ==
- List of rivers of Spain
