= Gerda Taro =

German photographer (1910–1937)

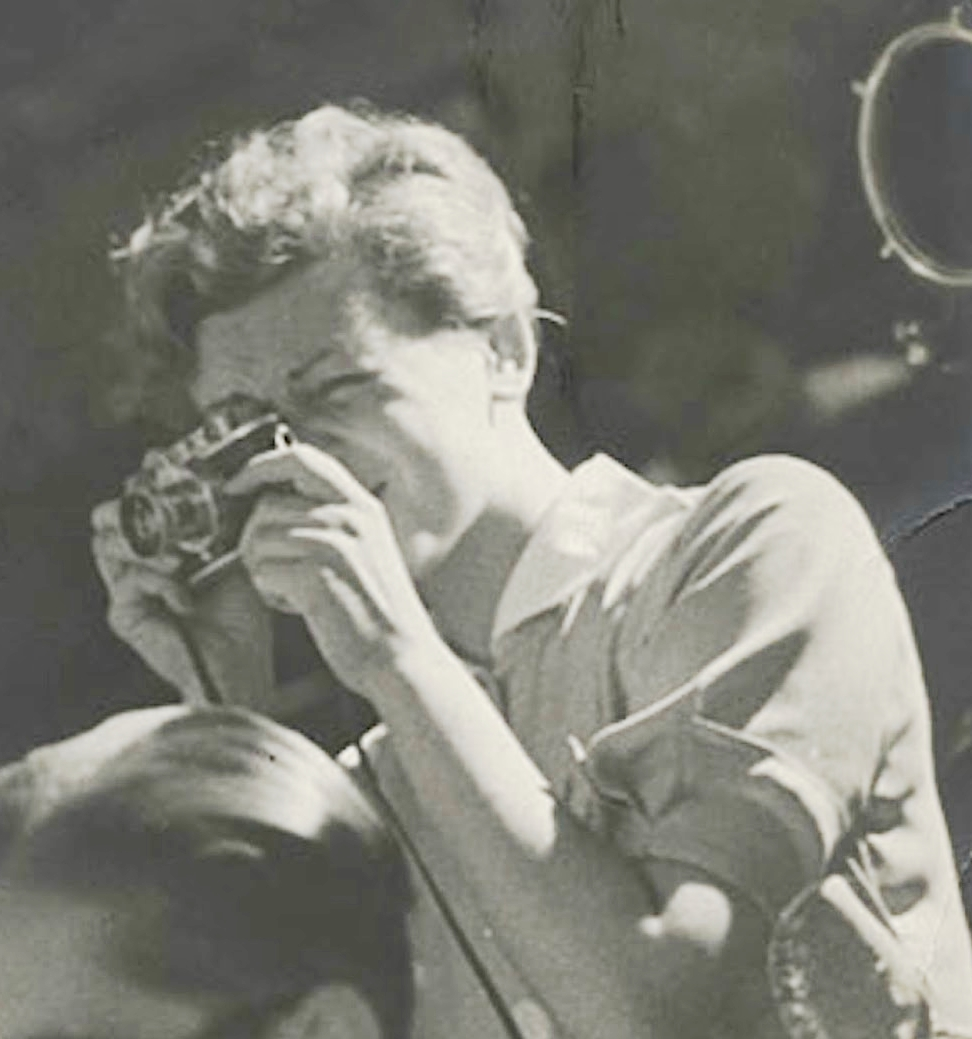
- Taro in Spain, July 1937, with Leica camera and 5cm Summar lens
- Born: Gerta Pohorylle; 1 August 1910; Stuttgart, German Empire
- Died: 26 July 1937 (aged 26); Brunete, Madrid, Spanish Republic
- Resting place: Cimetière du Père-Lachaise, Paris, France
- Years active: 1935–1937
- Employer: Alliance Photo
- Partner: Robert Capa (1935–1937)
- Parents: Heinrich Pohorylle (father); Gisela Boral (mother)

Gerta Pohorylle (1 August 1910 – 26 July 1937), known professionally as Gerda Taro, was a German Jewish war photographer active during the Spanish Civil War. She is regarded as the first female photojournalist to have died while covering the frontline in a war.

Taro was the companion and professional partner of photographer Robert Capa, who, like her, was Jewish. The name "Robert Capa" was originally an alias that Taro and Capa (born Endre Friedmann) shared, an invention meant to mitigate the increasing political intolerance in Europe and to attract the lucrative American market. Therefore, a significant amount of what is credited as Robert Capa's early work was actually created by Taro.

== Early life ==
Gerta Pohorylle was born on 1 August 1910 in Stuttgart, Germany, to Gisela Boral and Heinrich Pohorylle, a middle-class Jewish family that had recently emigrated from East Galicia. She studied at Queen Charlotte High School (de), spent a year at a Lausanne boarding school, and later attended a business college.

In 1929, the family moved to Leipzig, just prior to the rise of Nazi Germany. Taro opposed the Nazi Party and became interested in Leftist politics. In 1933, following the Nazi party's coming to power, she was arrested and detained for distributing propaganda against the National Socialists. Eventually, the entire Pohorylle household was forced to leave Germany toward different destinations. Taro, age 23, headed for Paris, while her parents attempted to reach mandatory Palestine. Her brothers went to England. She would not see her family for the rest of her life.

== Career ==
Taro's career was brief, but with great impact on photojournalism, especially in a war zone. Hanno Hardt honored her work with Robert Capa in the Spanish Civil War. He said that "Taro and Capa helped invent the genre of modern war photography while fueling the vicarious experience of the spectator by offering an approximation of life in the conflict zone."

=== Establishing the Robert Capa alias ===
When Pohorylle moved to Paris in 1934 to escape the antisemitism of Hitler's Germany she met the photojournalist Endre Friedmann, a Hungarian Jew, learned photography and became his personal assistant. They fell in love. From October 1935, Pohorylle began to work at Maria Eisner's Alliance Photo as a picture editor. Pohorylle also learned to take photographs because it was the only way to legalize her situation as the French authorities were granting residency at that time to photojournalists. Her first accreditation being dated 4 February 1936, issued by the ABC Press-Service agency in Amsterdam. Not only did the document authorise her resident status in France, but also allowed, and encouraged, her to work as a photojournalist. Then, she and Friedmann devised a plan where Friedmann claimed to be the agent of photographer Robert Capa, a name they invented. She introduced pictures by the fictitious American Capa to Alliance in the hope of higher royalties, but Eisner recognised his imagery and offered him a lower monthly advance of 1,100 francs in return for covering three assignments a week. Both took news photographs and sold them as the work of the non-existent American photographer Robert Capa; a convenient name overcoming the increasing political intolerance prevailing in Europe and attractive for the lucrative American market. The two worked together to cover the events surrounding the coming-to-power of the Popular Front in 1930s France.

=== Coverage of the Spanish Civil War ===
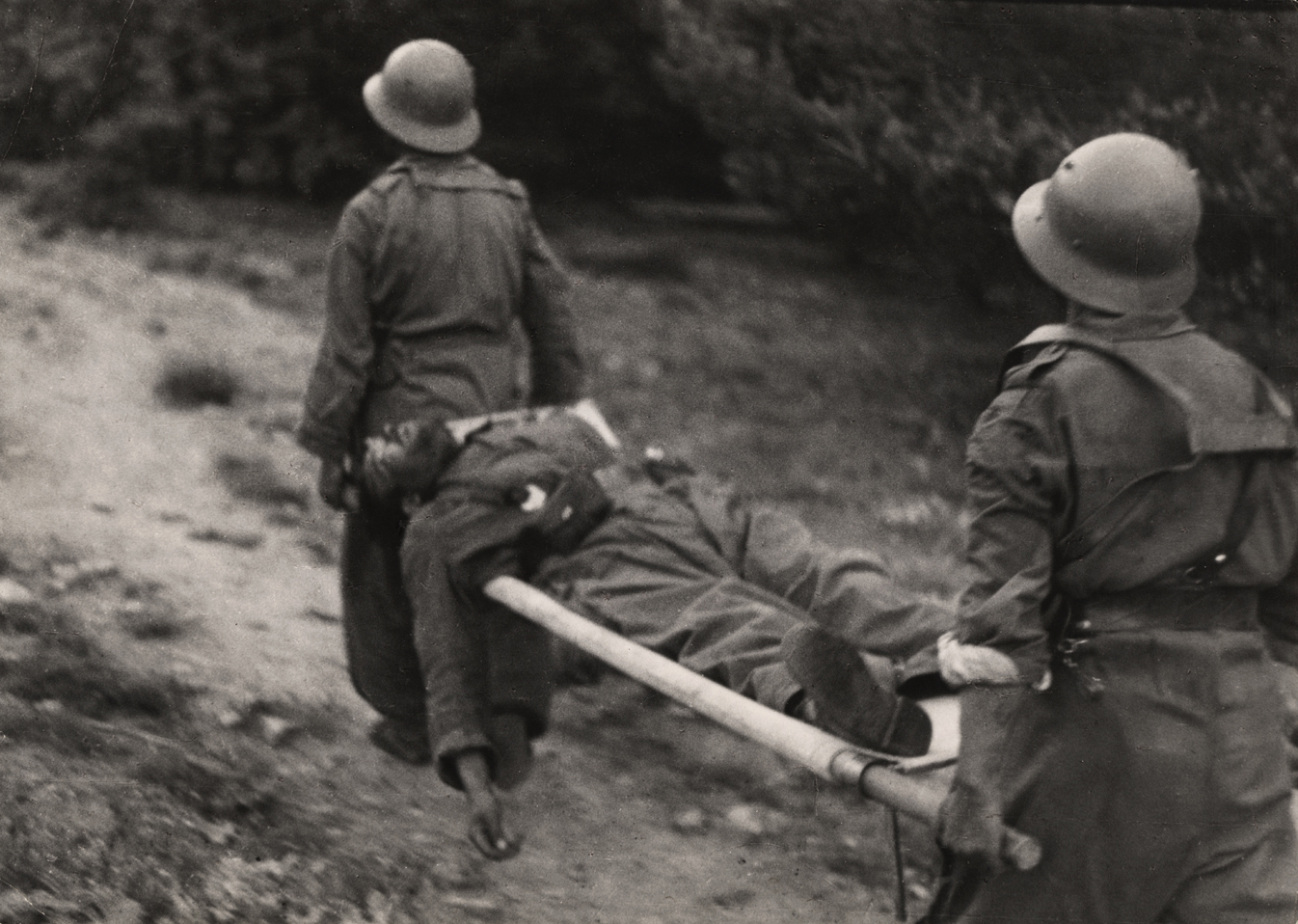
A 1937 photograph by Taro of Republican soldiers at the Navacerrada Pass in Spain

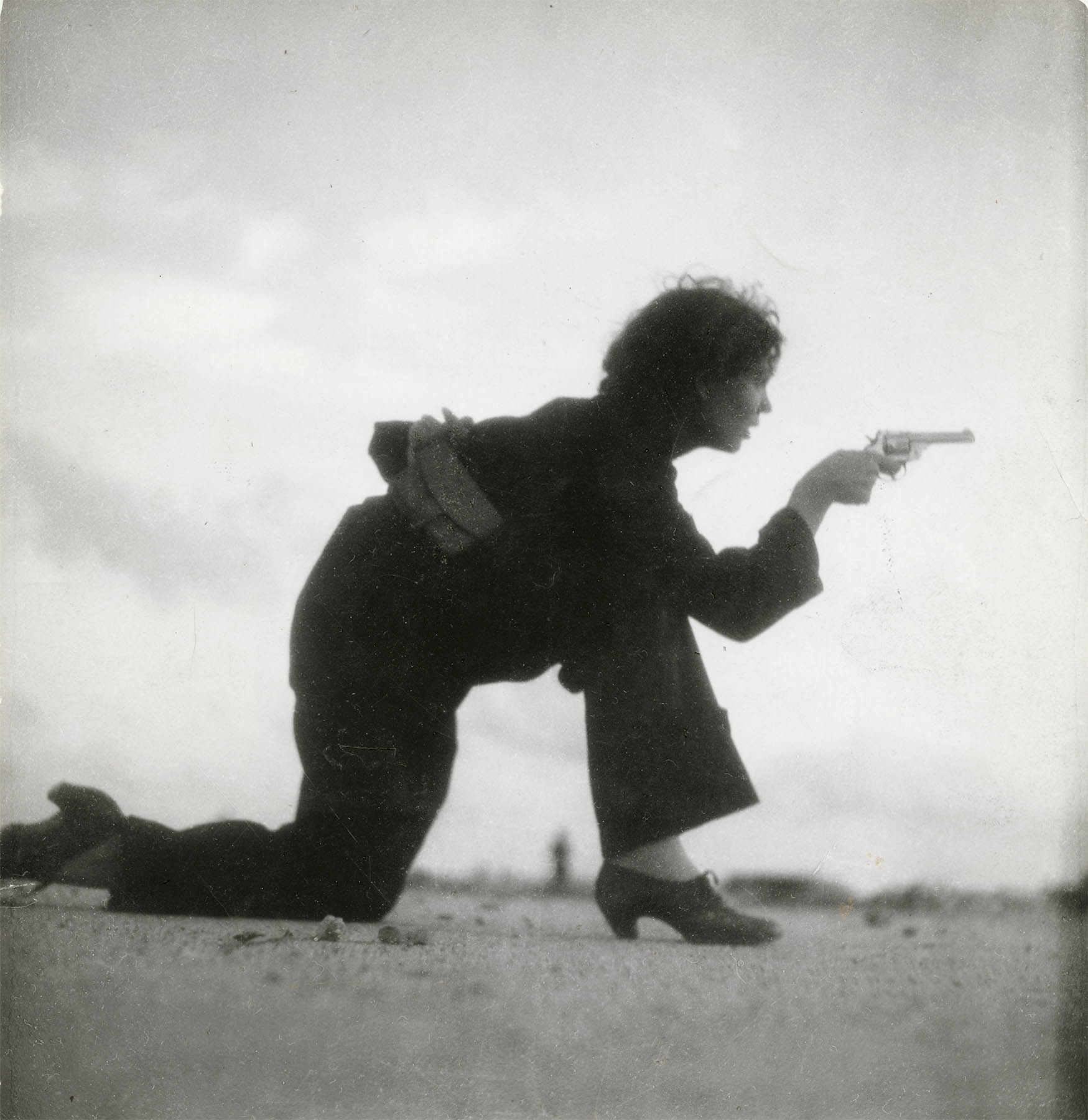
Woman training for a Republican militia by Gerda Taro (1936)

When the Spanish Civil War broke out in 1936, Taro travelled to Barcelona, Spain, to cover the events with Capa and David "Chim" Seymour. Taro acquired the nickname of La pequeña rubia ("The little blonde"). They covered the war together in northeastern Aragon and in the southern Córdoba province. Issuing their imagery in common under the alias 'Robert Capa', they succeeded in publishing in important publications including the Swiss Zürcher Illustrierte, the French Vu. Their early war photographs are distinguishable since Taro used a Rollei camera which rendered square format photographs while Capa produced rectangular pictures using a Contax camera or a Leica camera. However, for some time in 1937 they each produced similar 35 mm pictures under the label of Capa&Taro.

Subsequently, Taro attained some independence. She refused Capa's marriage proposal. Also, she became publicly related to the circle of anti-fascist European and intellectuals (such as Ernest Hemingway and George Orwell) who crusaded particularly for the Spanish Republic. Ce soir, a communist newspaper of France, signed her for publishing Taro's works only. Then, she began to commercialise her production under the Photo Taro label. Regards, Life, Illustrated London News and Volks-Illustrierte (the exile edition of Arbeiter-Illustrierte-Zeitung) were among the publications that used her work.

Reporting the Valencia bombing alone, Taro obtained the photographs which are her most celebrated. Also, in July 1937, Taro's photographs were in demand by the international press when, alone, she was covering the Brunete region near Madrid for Ce Soir. Although the Nationalist propaganda claimed that the region was under its control, the Republican forces had in fact forced that faction out. Taro's photographs were the only testimony of the actual situation.

== Death ==
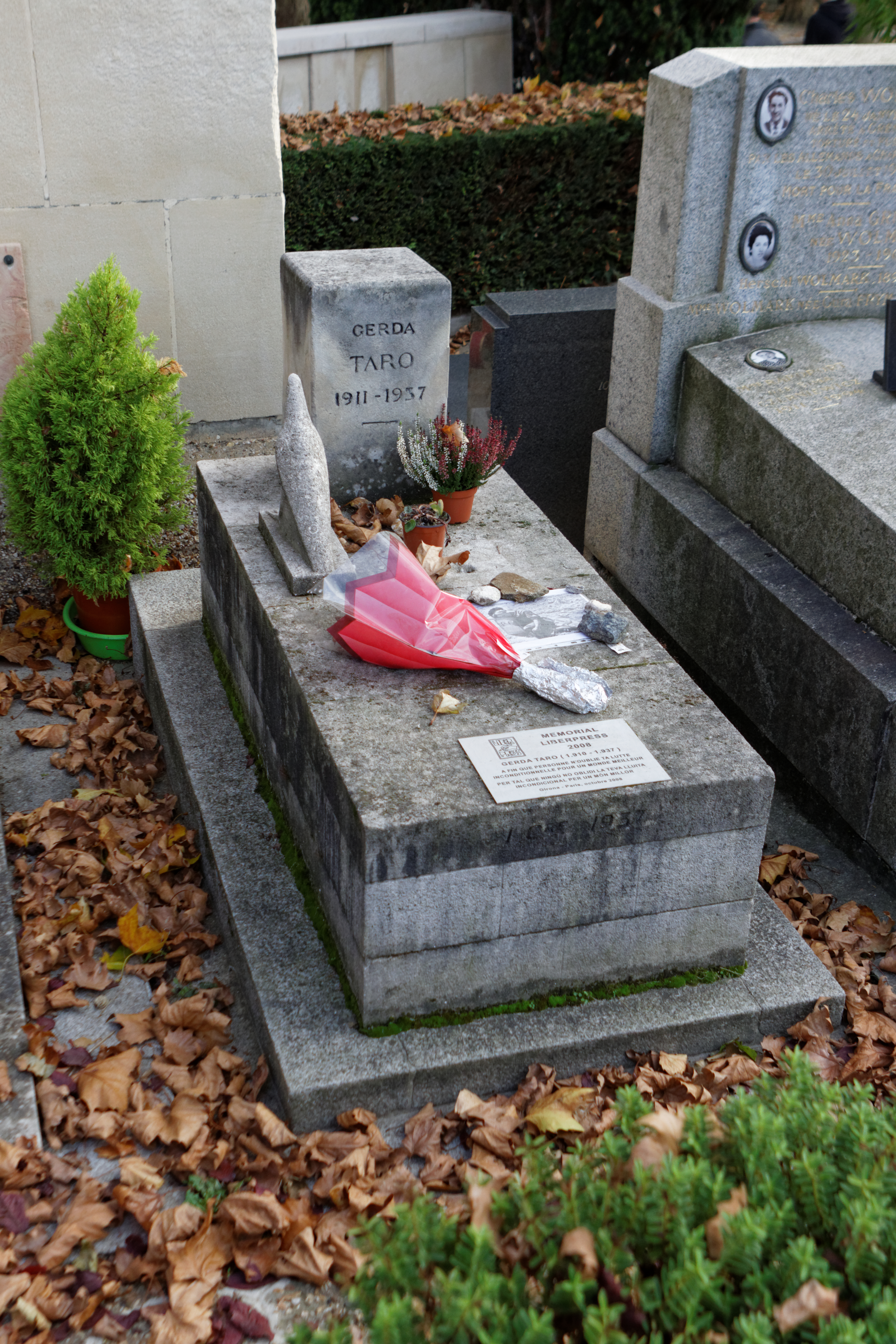
Taro's grave at Père Lachaise Cemetery. Designed by Alberto Giacometti, it features the falcon Horus, and the epitaph "So nobody will forget your unconditional struggle for a better world" (in French and Catalan)

During her coverage of the Republican army retreat at the Battle of Brunete, Taro hopped onto the runningboard of General Walter's car that was carrying wounded soldiers. As reported in Le Soir on Tuesday 27 July 1937 and relayed in the Belfast Telegraph;

During the fighting at Brunete on Sunday [25 July] Mlle. Taro rallied a retreating group of militia, and persuaded them to return to occupy one of the trenches, where they withstood an intense bombardment for an hour. When forced to retreat, Mlle. Taro jumped on the running board of a car. An insurgent tank rushing up to the lines emerged suddenly from a side road and collided with the car. Mlle. Taro was rushed to hospital at Escorial seriously hurt and given blood transfusion, but died yesterday morning.

Taro's critical wounds caused her death on 26 July 1937.

The circumstances of Taro's death have been questioned by British journalist Robin Stummer, writing in the New Statesman. Stummer cited Willy Brandt, later Chancellor of West Germany, and a friend of Taro during the Spanish Civil War, saying that she had been the victim of the Stalinist purge of Communists and Socialists in Spain who were not aligned to Moscow. Taro was "warned by Willy Brandt in the summer of 1937 against working in Spain," yet she went there anyway, not controlled by the left in Moscow.

In an interview with the Spanish daily El País, a nephew of a Republican soldier at the Battle of Brunete explained that she had died in an accident. According to the eye-witness account, she had been run over by a reversing tank and she died from her wounds at the El Goloso English hospital a few hours later. The tank driver did not realize what he had done.

Due to her political commitment, Taro had become a respected anti-fascist figure. On 1 August 1937, on what would have been her 27th birthday, the French Communist Party gave her a grand funeral in Paris, drawing tens of thousands of people on to the streets, buried her at Père Lachaise Cemetery, and commissioned Alberto Giacometti to create a monument for her grave.

In early 2018, a photograph purported to be an image of Taro on her deathbed in the English war hospital was released by the son of the Hungarian physician, Dr Kiszely, who treated her.

== Legacy ==
On 26 September 2007, the International Center of Photography opened the first major U.S. exhibition of Taro's photographs.

In October 2008, the City of Stuttgart named a square at the intersection of Hohenheimer, Dannecker and Alexander Strasse after Taro: the Gerda-Taro-Platz. The square was redesigned in 2014, with an inauguration ceremony on 18 November, to include nine metal steles, each with one letter of her name cut out, visible from a distance.

In the summer of 2016 an open-air display of Taro's Spanish Civil War photographs was part of the f/stop photography festival in Leipzig. When the festival ended, it was decided the display, partly paid for by crowdfunding, would become permanent. Shortly after, on 4 August, the display of Taro's work was destroyed by smearing it with black paint. With a crowdfunding project to restore the work ongoing, the destroyed work remains in place. It is suspected the destruction is motivated by anti-refugee or anti-semitic sentiments.

The novel Waiting for Robert Capa, by Susana Fortes (2011 – English translation by Adriana V. López), is a fictionalized account of the life of Taro and Capa.

The documentary film, The Mexican Suitcase (2011), tells the story of a suitcase of 4,500 lost negatives taken by Taro, Capa and David Seymour during the Spanish Civil War. The suitcase, and the negatives, are currently housed at the International Center of Photography in New York City.

The British indie rock band alt-J's song "Taro" is about her role as a war photographer during the Spanish Civil War as well as her relationship to Capa. The song describes the graphic details of Capa's death ("A violent wrench grips mass / Rips light, tears limbs like rags") and imagines Taro's complementary emotions.

In 2017 the City Council of Madrid decided to name a street in the city Calle Gerda Taro (Gerda Taro Street), a street running from Avenida de la Victoria to Calle Durango; it is located northwest from the city center along the route A6.

The city of Paris did the same in 2019 with the new Rue Gerda Taro, in the 13th arrondissement, by unanimous vote of the political groups of the Council of Paris.

In 2018, the city of Leipzig named a new gymnasium for 1,200 students after Taro; it is near the display of her photographs on permanent exhibition.

She was highlighted on Google’s Doodle on August 1, 2018.

In 2017 she was the subject of the novel The Girl with the Leica, by Helena Janeczek.

In the 2022 International Center of Photography exhibition, "Death in the Making: Reexamining the Iconic Spanish Civil War Photobook," new revelations and significance about Gerda Taro's contribution to Robert Capa's photobook, "Death in the Making," are highlighted.

In 2023 she was the subject of the verse novel, One Last Shot, by Kip Wilson.

In 2026, she was portrayed by Emilia Schüle, a German actress in the film The Girl with the Leica by Alina Marazzi, co-written with Valia Santella, based on Helena Janeczek's 2017 novel La ragazza con la Leica.

== Exhibitions ==
Death in the Making: Reexamining the Iconic Spanish Civil War Photobook, September 29, 2022 – January 9, 2023, International Center of Photography, New York, NY.

== Publications ==
- Capa, Robert (1938), Death in the Making, New York: Covici Friede, "Photographs by Taro and Capa"
