= The Girl with the Leica =

2026 Italian drama film

- Official poster
- Italian: La ragazza con la Leica
- Directed by: Alina Marazzi
- Screenplay by: Alina Marazzi; Valia Santella
- Based on: La ragazza con la Leica by Helena Janeczek
- Produced by: Marta Donzelli; Gregorio Paonessa; Jonas Dornbach; Janine Jackowski; Maren Ade
- Starring: Emilia Schüle; Luna Wedler; Aaron Altaras; Lucas Englander
- Cinematography: Manuel Alberto Claro
- Edited by: Ilaria Fraioli
- Music by: Dominik Scherrer
- Production companies: Vivo Film; Rai Cinema; Komplizen Film; Zweites Deutsches Fernsehen (ZDF); Eolo Films Productions; Film i Väst; Zentropa International Sweden
- Distributed by: BiM Distribuzione
- Release date: 2 September 2026 (Venice)
- Running time: 119 minutes
- Countries: Italy; Germany; Sweden
- Languages: German; English; Spanish; French

The Girl with the Leica (Italian: La ragazza con la Leica, German: Das Mädchen mit der Leica) is a 2026 biographical drama film directed by Alina Marazzi, co-written with Valia Santella and based on Helena Janeczek’s 2017 novel La ragazza con la Leica. Starring Emilia Schüle, Luna Wedler, Aaron Altaras, and Lucas Englander, it follows Gerda Taro (Schüle), the first female photojournalist killed on a battlefield.

The film had its world premiere as the opening film of Orizzonti section of the 83rd Venice International Film Festival on 2 September 2026.

== Synopsis ==
Set in Paris on July 14, 1937, the film follows German-Jewish photojournalist Gerda Taro on her final day before returning to the Spanish Civil War. As she spends time with Robert Capa and friends who fled Nazi Germany, memories of her political activism, exile in Paris, relationship with photographer André Friedmann, and discovery of photography emerge.

The film portrays Taro's growing commitment to using her camera as a means of resistance against fascism and her determination to document the war. Taro was killed while covering the Spanish Civil War in 1937.

== Cast ==
- Emilia Schüle as Gerda Taro
- Luna Wedler as Ruth Cerf
- Aaron Altaras as Robert Capa
- Lucas Englander as Georg Kuritzkes
- Thomas Schubert as Willy Chardack
- Sebastian Schneider as Csiki Weisz
- Idan Weiss as David Seymour / Chim
- Lia von Blarer as Lilo Stein
- Hans-Christian Hegewald as Fred Stein
- Jeremy Mockridge as Ted Allan
- Joel Basman as Bertolt Brecht
- Francesca Biliotti as Helene Weigel

== Production ==
Principal photography began on 17 September 2025 at locations in Leipzig, Merseburg, Torino, Paris, Rome. Filming ended on 29 October 2025 after shooting in France: Paris Île-de-France, Germany: Saxony, Italy: Lazio, and Piedmont.

== Release ==
Director Alina Marazzi attends the Screening during the 83rd Venice International Film Festival at Sala Darsena on 2 September 2026 in Venice

The Girl with the Leica had its world premiere in the Orizzonti section of the 83rd Venice International Film Festival on 2 September 2026. It was screened in TIFF's Market under Market Screening programme at the 2026 Toronto International Film Festival on 13 September 2026.

It will also be featured in Kaleidoscope section of Filmfest Hamburg on 29 September 2026.

It will screen in Departure section at the 62nd Chicago International Film Festival on 22 October 2026.

Rome-based sales company Fandango Sales acquired the international sales rights to the film before its world premiere in Venice.

== Reception ==
=== Critical response ===
Reviewing at Venice International Film Festival for Cineuropa, Veronica Orciari praised the film for its cohesive narrative and distinctive visual style, highlighting Alina Marazzi's depiction of Gerda Taro's commitment to photography as a means of resisting fascism and documenting the Spanish Civil War. She particularly commended Manuel Alberto Claro's cinematography and Ilaria Fraioli's editing for strengthening the film's visual impact and pacing. Orciari praised Emilia Schüle's performance as the film's "strongest element". She also praised the production design, costumes, locations and soundtrack. Orciari concluded that the film could appeal both to audiences interested in true stories and "20th-century history" and to general viewers, calling its portrayal of the relatively little-known Taro "a truly worthwhile watch."

=== Accolades ===
Award	Date of ceremony	Category	Recipient(s)	Result	Ref.
Venice Film Festival	12 September 2026	Orizzonti Award for Best Film	The Girl with the Leica	Nominated	
Venice Film Festival	12 September 2026	Pasinetti Special prize	The Girl with the Leica	Won	
Venice Film Festival	12 September 2026	1964 Pop Art Award	The Girl with the Leica	Won	
