= Robin Stummer =

Robin Stummer is a British-Austrian journalist who writes for national newspapers and magazines in the United Kingdom, focusing on culture, history, conservation, photographic history and espionage.

== Early life and education ==
Stummer studied English literature at Birmingham University, and post-graduate journalism at City University, London.

== Career ==
In the late 1980s Stummer was a freelance writer for The Observer newspaper and the foreign desk of the Independent. He has also worked as a researcher for the author and journalist William Shawcross, current Chairman of the Charity Commission for England and Wales, on his biography of Rupert Murdoch. Stummer travelled in Eastern Europe in the 1980s. In 1989 and 1990 he was based in Sofia, Bulgaria, covering the fall of the Communist government of Todor Zhivkov, and its aftermath, for the Independent and other titles.

At the Independent on Sunday he covered arts, culture and heritage, and subsequently at The Guardian, where he was a journalist for Weekend magazine. He wrote on heritage, architecture, war and music. He is the only journalist to have taken part in a Russian Air Force surveillance flight, over Britain. In 1997 Stummer covered the general election clash in the Tatton constituency, in the county of Cheshire, between Neil Hamilton and former BBC war correspondent Martin Bell, for the Independent on Sunday.

Other work by Stummer has included news and feature writing for the Observer, Guardian, Independent and Independent on Sunday newspapers, and the New Statesman, Independent on Sunday Review and Quintessentially magazines, the latter as contributing editor. He is an occasional contributor to Private Eye. He has reported from across Europe, Russia and the Middle East.

Stummer has taken part in architecture and cultural protection campaigns, including those to protect the 17th-century Hampshire farmhouse home of portrait painter Mary Beale, the first woman professional artist in Britain to manage her own studio; the efforts to keep open the Foundry bar in Shoreditch, east London, haunt of artists of the 1990s Britart scene; and to prevent the loss of historic buildings in the historic Liberty of Norton Folgate district of East London; and to protect the medieval Harmondsworth Great Barn, Middlesex, at risk from the proposed expansion of Heathrow Airport. He has written on the threat to Soviet-era buildings in Moscow, the destruction of ancient villages in eastern Germany to make way for open-cast coal mines, and the discovery of a house with close links to the artist Peter Paul Rubens, near Antwerp, which local campaigners fear will be harmed with the expansion of the city's nearby container port. He blogs on culture and heritage for The Oldie magazine.

== Cornerstone magazine ==
In 2004 Stummer launched Cornerstone magazine, an architecture protection quarterly. He was the magazine's editor. It was published by the Society for the Protection of Ancient Buildings (SPAB), a conservation organization. The magazine became a formal Journal of Record for the British Library, London, and Library of Congress, Washington. Its editions included coverage of heritage and conservation issues and extensive photography. Writers included Germaine Greer, Julie Burchill, Jeanette Winterson, Martin Bell, John Tusa, Ken Russell, Bill Bryson, Robert Fisk and Rod Liddle. Photographers included John Lawrence, Si Barber, Kippa Matthews, Laurence Weedy and Andy Marshall.

Under his editorship, from 2002 until early 2012, Cornerstone reported on major conservation aspects of plans for airport expansion in south-east England. In particular he published articles about likely damage to heritage buildings, sites and landscapes posed by the HS2 high-speed rail scheme from London to the north of England. Cornerstone was the first publication to report on HS2's harmful effect on legally protected areas and sites in England. Its reporting on HS2 was followed up by the BBC, and the national press. Cornerstone suddenly ceased publication in 2012 when its publishers created a new magazine to take the place of Cornerstone, under a new Editor. There followed a lengthy legal dispute between Stummer and the publisher of the magazine, who were advised by lawyers close to HS2 Ltd. Stummer was issued with a High Court writ to prevent publication of content from Cornerstone online, the first time a British journalist had been issued with a writ of this kind. The writ was withdrawn a year later.

== Recent activity ==
Stummer has been researching the lives of the early Magnum agency photographers; politics, art and espionage in wartime Britain – for the Observer he wrote about art and heritage protectionists Ronald Edmond Balfour as well as British pop artist Pauline Boty. And he covered the international effects of the possible destruction of the Victorian Smithfield Market in London and other heritage and natural sites in Britain. Stummer has been researching the life and mysterious death of Matthias Sindelar, the 1930s Viennese footballer.

== Photography ==
Stummer studied documentary photography at the University of the Arts, London, and with the Magnum photojournalism agency in Munich. He has written on documentary reportage photography, including work by Robert Capa, Magnum photographers and wartime Life magazine photo editor and Magnum manager, John G. Morris, Cornell Capa, Gerda Taro and Lewis Morley.
