= Mino La Franca =

Italian photographer, artist, and illustrator

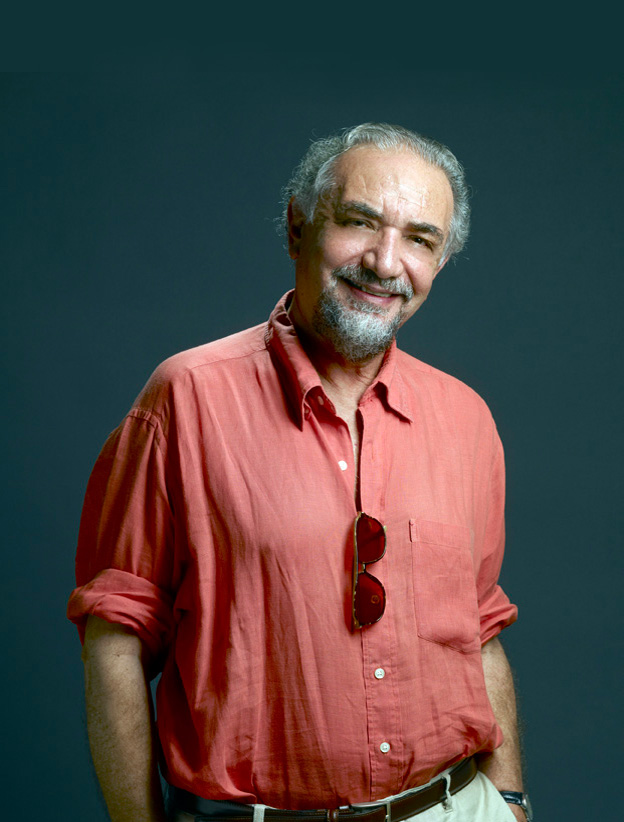
Mino La Franca

Mino La Franca is an Italian photographer, artist, and illustrator. He has exhibited his works in several cities, including New York at the Casa Italiana Zerilli-Marimò, and in Bangkok. La Franca's last exhibition, ROMA-AMOR, juxtaposed images of death and rebirth.

In addition to commercial and advertising photography, La Franca has worked in theater in lyric opera, composing series of images that create a scenography and compose a narration. As an illustrator, La Franca has produced a series of children's books in brilliant colors, using animals in situations that are real and surreal, with titles such as Tonino in the Jungle and Gina Goose Counts. His children's books include the photographic retelling of classical stories, including The Three Musketeers, Around the World in 80 Days, The Jungle Book, Cinderella, and Snow White.
