= Russian Journal =

Russian Journal may refer to one of the following

- A Russian Journal, a 1948 book by John Steinbeck
- Russian Journal, a 1981 book by Andrea Lee
- Russian Journal (website), a Russian online publication
