= Crowds Running for Shelter When the Air-raid Alarm Sounded =

1937 photograph by Robert Capa

Crowds running for shelter when the air-raid alarm sounded, Bilbao, Spain, 1937

Crowds Running for Shelter When the Air-raid Alarm Sounded is a black and white photograph taken by Robert Capa in Bilbao, Basque Country, during the Spanish Civil War in May 1937. It is one of the most famous photographs that he took during the conflict. Capa took many photographs of crowds running for shelter during the Spanish Civil War (1937, 1939) and in 1938, in China.

== Description ==
The picture depicts the moment when a group of people listens to the air-raid alarm, indicating that enemy aviation was approaching for a bombardment. The Basque Country was traditionally a conservative region of Spain but nevertheless was supportive of the Republican government in their struggle against Francisco Franco nationalists and their allies. In this dramatic moment, a woman looks to the sky as she crosses a street with a little girl, most likely her daughter, by her hand. A group of five people, two men and three women, listen also to the air-raid alarm. They don't hide their visible concern as they look to the sky too, except one woman, but still remain quiet. It is uncertain from the picture's point of view if they are able to see any approaching planes. The woman's gaze seems to invite the viewer to imagine what is in the sky.

== Analysis ==
The photograph has been read as ambiguous, insofar as it does not depict war or provide a moralistic commentary. Other scholars have described how the popularity of this image and similar photographs by Capa created a sense that fascism was a particularly European phenomenon.

== Public collections ==
A paper print of the photograph is held at the International Center of Photography, in New York.
