= Roberto Pazzi =

Italian novelist and poet (1946–2023)

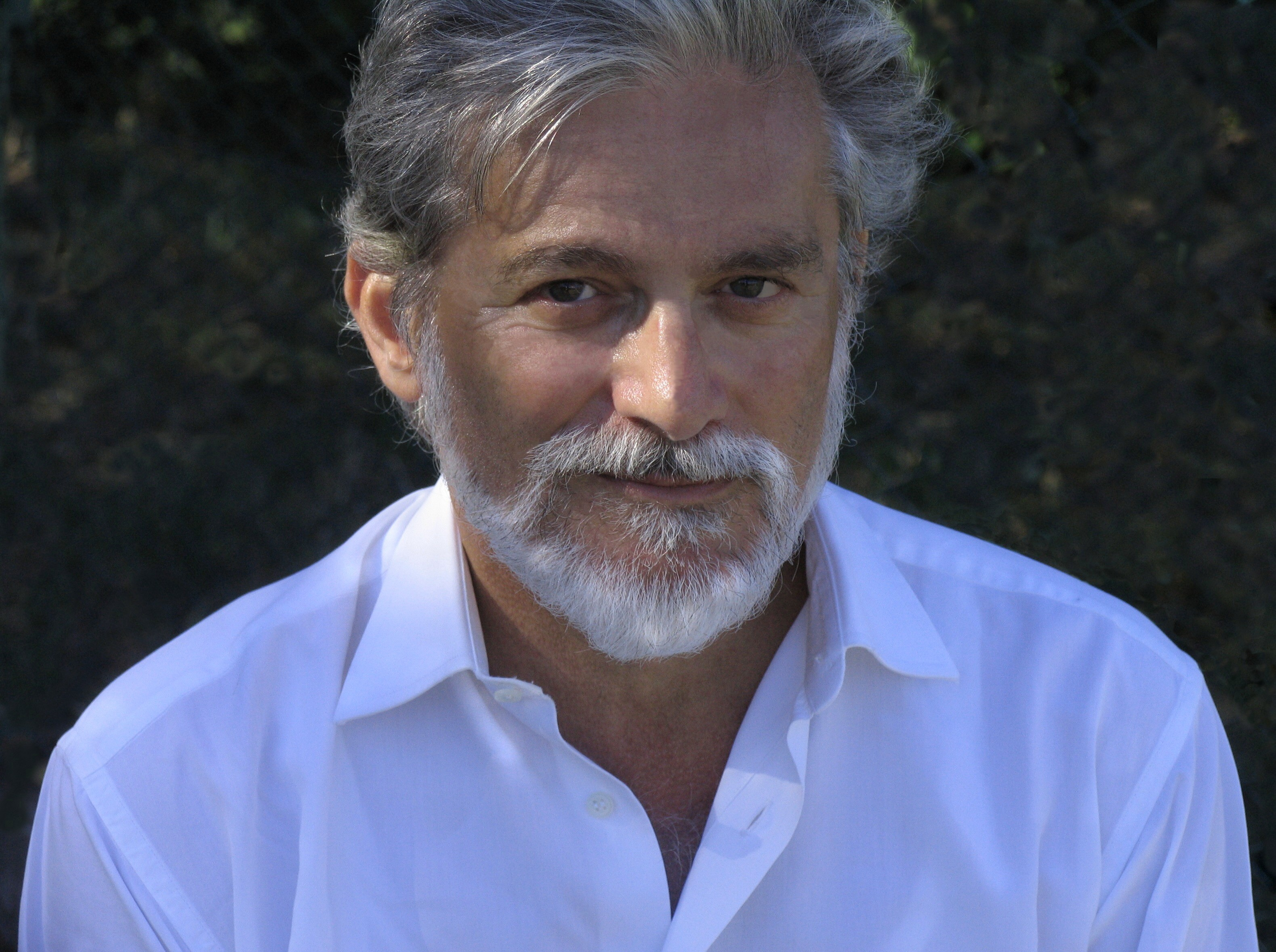
- Pazzi in 2005
- Born: 18 August 1946; Ameglia, Italy
- Died: 2 December 2023 (aged 77); Ferrara, Italy
- Occupation: Novelist
- Writing career
- Language: Italian

Roberto Pazzi (18 August 1946 – 2 December 2023) was an Italian novelist and poet. His works have been translated into twenty-six languages. He was widely recognized in Italian literary circles for his poetry and novels. His debut novel, Cercando l'Imperatore in 1985, received a number of international awards and started a prolific career of historical and contemporary novels.

Pazzi lived in Ferrara, where he taught at the university, held annual creative writing courses and, for Corbo editore, led the series of narratives "L'Isola Bianca". He was an active lecturer in the various countries of the world where his work has spread.

== Biography ==
=== Early life and education ===
Pazzi was born on 18 August 1946 in Ameglia, a small comune in Liguria, Italy. Pazzi attended Liceo Arostio in Ferrara before going on to study classics at the University of Bologna, where he wrote a thesis on aesthetics of the poetics of Umberto Saba.

=== Teaching ===
Pazzi taught cultural anthropology and the philosophy of history in high schools and the University of Ferrara. He also taught sociology and sociology of art and literature in Urbino. In 2014, he established the Itaca school of creative writing in Ferrara.

=== Journalism ===
As a journalist, he initially started writing for the Corriere della Sera in 1985, entering an exclusive partnership that would last twelve years until 1997. Subsequently, Pazzi began writing for il Resto del Carlino, La Nazione and Il Giorno (all under the Quotidiano Nazionale brand) as well as The New York Times.

=== Publishing career ===
His first poems appeared in a poetry anthology in the magazine Arte e poesia in 1970. His collections of verse are: L'esperienza anteriore (I dispari, 1973), Versi occidentali (Rebellato 1976), Il re, le parole (Lacaita, 1980), Calma di vento (Garzanti, 1987), Il filo delle bugie (Corbo, 1994), La gravità dei corpi (Palomar 1998) and Talismani (Marietti 2003).

Pazzi published his first novel Cercando l'Imperatore in 1985. The novel was translated into 12 languages and won the Premio Bergamo. He followed Cercando l'Imperatore with various historical novels: La principessa e il drago (Garzanti 1986), La malattia del tempo (Marietti 1987, Garzanti 1991), Vangelo di Giuda (Garzanti 1989) and La stanza sull'acqua (Garzanti 1991, Bompiani 2012).

With Le città del dottor Malaguti (Garzanti 1993) he moved his novels to a contemporary setting in the town where the book's narrator lives, Ferrara. After that, he wrote Incerti di viaggio (Longanesi 1996, premio Selezione Campiello, superpremio Penne-Mosca 1996), Domani sarò re (Longanesi 1997), La città volante (Baldini & Castoldi 1999, finalist at Premio Strega, introduced by Dario Fo and Sebastiano Vassalli, reprinted by Frassinelli ), Conclave (Frassinelli 2001, Barbera 2012, premio Scanno, premio Comisso, Superpremio Flaiano, premio Stresa, premio Zerilli Marimò of New York University, premio Rapolano Terme, finalist at premio Viareggio, finalist at premio Bigiaretti, translated in 15 countries, among these Germany, USA, France, and Spain), L'erede (Frassinelli 2002, finalist at premio Viareggio, premio Maria Cristina, translated in German), Il signore degli occhi (Frassinelli 2004, premio Cala di Volpe), L'ombra del padre (Frassinelli 2005, translated in French, premio Elsa Morante Isola di Procida), Qualcuno mi insegue (Frassinelli 2007), Le forbici di Solingen (Corbo 2007), Dopo primavera (Frassinelli, 2008), and Mi spiacerà morire per non vederti più (Corbo 2010).

=== Death ===
Pazzi died on 2 December 2023 in Ferrara at the age of 77, after having been hospitalised since 24 November.

== Works ==
=== Poetry ===
- L'esperienza anteriore, I Dispari (1973)
- Versi occidentali, Rebellato (1976)
- Il re, le parole, Lacaita (1980)
- Calma di vento Garzanti (1987)
- Il filo delle bugie, Corbo (1994)
- La gravità dei corpi, Palomar (1998)
- Talismani, Marietti (2003)
- Felicità di perdersi, Barbera (2013)
- Un giorno senza sera, La Nave di Teseo (2020)

=== Novels ===
- Cercando l'Imperatore, Marietti (1985)
- La principessa e il drago, Garzanti (1986)
- La malattia del tempo, Marietti (1987)
- Vangelo di Giuda, Garzanti (1989)
- La stanza sull'acqua, Garzanti (1991)
- Le città del dottor Malaguti, Garzanti (1993)
- Incerti di viaggio, Longanesi (1996)
- Domani sarò Re, Longanesi (1997)
- La città volante, Baldini e Castoldi (1999)
- Conclave, Frassinelli (2001)
- L'erede, Frassinelli (2002)
- Il signore degli occhi, Frassinelli (2004)
- L'ombra del padre, Frassinelli (2005)
- Qualcuno mi insegue, Frassinelli (2007)
- Le forbici di Solingen, Corbo (2007)
- Dopo primavera, Frassinelli (2008)
- Mi spiacerà morire per non vederti più, Corbo (2010)
- D'amore non esistono peccati, Barbera (2012)
- La trasparenza del buio, Bompiani (2014)
- La stanza sull'acqua, I Grandi Tascabili Bompiani (2012)
- Lazzaro, Bompiani (2017)
- Verso Sant'Elena, Bompiani (2019)
- Hotel Padreterno, La Nave di Teseo (2021)
- La stanza sull'acqua, i Delfini, La Nave di Teseo (2022)
- La doppia vista, La Nave di Teseo (2023)

== Awards ==
- Selezione Campiello Prize (1985)
- Bergamo Prize (1985)
- Hemingway Prize (1985)
- Maria Cristina Prize (1986)
- Lerici Pea Prize (1986)
- Piombino Prize (1986)
- Eugenio Montale Prize (1987)
- Rhegium Julii Prize 1987
- Super Grinzane Cavour Prize (1990)
- Castiglioncello Prize (1993)
- Del tascabile Prize (1994)
- Valsassina Prize (1994)
- Selezione Campiello Prize (1996)
- Penne Prize (1996)
- Calliope Prize (1998)
- Frascati Prize (1998)
- Miscia Lanciano Prize (2000)
- Zerilli-Marimò Prize for Italian Fiction (2001) for Conclave
- Flaiano Prize (2001)
- Scanno Prize (2001)
- Comisso Prize (2001)
- Stresa Prize 2001
- Rapolano Terme Prize (2001)
- Maria Cristina Prize (2004)
- Recanati Prize (2006)
- Procida Elsa Morante Prize (2006)
- Scalea Prize (2007)
- Bigiaretti Prize (2007)
- Giorgio La Pira Prize (2008)
