= Italian studies =

Field of philology related to Italian language or literature

Italian studies is an interdisciplinary field dealing with the study of the Italian language, literature, art, history, politics, culture and society.

== List of academic institutions offering Italian studies programmes outside of Italy ==
=== Australia ===
- Department of Italian Studies at University of Melbourne;
- Department of Languages and Culture at La Trobe University;
- Department of European Languages at Monash University;
- Department of Italian Studies at University of Sydney;
- Department of Italian Studies at The Australian National University;
- Department of Italian Studies at Flinders University;
- Department of Italian Studies at Griffith University;
- Department of Italian Studies at University of Western Australia;
- Department of Languages and Culture at University of Queensland;

=== Canada ===
- Department of Italian Studies at University of Toronto Faculty of Arts and Science;
- Department of Language Studies at University of Toronto Mississauga;
- Department of Italian Studies at McGill University;
- Department of Modern Languages and Literatures at Université de Montréal;
- Department of Modern Languages and Literatures at University of Ottawa;
- Department of French, Hispanic and Italian Studies at University of British Columbia;
- Department of Spanish and Italian at Queen's University;
- Department of Modern Languages and Cultural Studies at University of Alberta;
- Department of Modern Languages, Literatures, and Cultures Brock University;

=== China ===
- Department of Italian Studies at University of International Business and Economics;
- School of European Languages and Culture at Beijing Foreign Studies University
- Department of Italian at Nankai University

=== Croatia ===
- Department of Italian Studies at University of Rijeka

=== Ireland ===
- Department of Italian at University College Cork
- Department of Italian at Trinity College Dublin
- Discipline of Italian at University of Galway

=== Japan ===
- Department of Italian Linguistics at Kyoto Sangyo University;

=== Lithuania ===
- Department of Italian Linguistics and Literature at Vilnius University Faculty of Philology;

=== Slovenia ===
- Italian Studies at University of Primorska

=== South Africa ===
- Department of Italian at University of the Witwatersrand

=== United Kingdom ===
- Italian Studies at Oxford University;
- Department of Italian at Cambridge University;
- Department of Italian Studies at Manchester University;
- Department of Italian at University College London;
- Department of Italian at Leeds University;
- Department of Italian at Warwick University;
- Department of Italian at Reading University;
- Department of Italian at St. Andrews University;
- Department of Italian at Bristol University;
- Department of Languages and International Studies at Nottingham Trent University;

=== United States ===
- Department of Italian Studies at Yale University;
- Department of Italian Studies at Georgetown University;
- Department of Italian Studies at the College of William & Mary;
- Department of Italian Studies at New York University (Casa Italiana Zerilli-Marimò);
- Department of Italian Studies at Brown University;
- Department of Italian Studies at University of California, Berkeley;
- Department of Romance, German, Russian Languages and Literature at University of California, Long Beach;
- Department of Italian at University of California, Los Angeles;
- Department of Italian at Columbia University;
- Italian Academy for Advanced Studies (Casa Italiana);
- Department of Italian at Yale University;
- Department of French and Italian at The University of Texas at Austin
- Department of French and Italian at University of Wisconsin;
- Department of French and Italian at Stanford University;
- Department of French and Italian at Princeton University;
- Department of French and Italian at Indiana University;
- Department of French and Italian at Ohio State University;
- Department of Romance Studies at Duke University
- Department of Romance Studies at Cornell University
- Department of Romance Languages and Literatures at Harvard University;
- Department of Romance Languages and Literatures at University of Chicago;
- Department of Romance Languages and Literatures at University of Michigan;
- Department of Romance Languages and Literatures at University of Notre Dame;
- Casa Italiana at the Nazareth College.
- Department of Romance Languages at University of Pennsylvania;
- Department of Romance Studies at Boston University;
- Department of Romance studies at The University of North Carolina at Chapel Hill;

== Non-Italian Italian studies associations ==
=== The American Association for Italian Studies ===
The American Association for Italian Studies (AAIS) was founded in 1988. Its purpose is to encourage, support, and conduct research activities in Italian culture, including areas such as Italian language, art, music, history, literature, folklore, and popular culture, and well as its influence on other cultures.

Members of the Association are individuals either holding a Ph.D. or Laurea in an area of Italian studies or an equivalent degree in Italian Studies; holding an academic position at the university or College level; enrolled in an advanced degree program in an area of Italian Studies above the master's degree Level.

The AAIS holds an annual meeting and periodically publishes a scholarly journal called Italian Culture.

=== The Association for the Study of Modern Italy ===
The Association for the Study of Modern Italy was founded in 1982 by Christopher Seton-Watson, to bring together individuals and organisations from the UK and abroad with teaching, research, professional or general interests in modern Italy from all disciplinary angles.

Today, ASMI's membership is international and includes scholars and others from a wide range of disciplinary backgrounds including history, political science, languages, geography, literature and anthropology.

ASMI publishes a quarterly journal called Modern Italy.

=== The Canadian Association for Italian Studies ===
The Canadian Association for Italian Studies (CAIS, formerly known as the Canadian Society for Italian Studies or CSIS) was established in 1972, to foster and advance Italian studies in Canada and in the larger global community.

The CAIS aim is to provide a forum for the exchange of ideas through the presentation and discussion of papers that deal with diverse aspects of Italian language, literature, pedagogy, society, and culture. The CAIS publishes a biannual journal called Quaderni d’italianistica.

=== The Society for Italian Studies ===
The Society for Italian Studies (SIS) is a registered charity that strives "...to advance public education by furthering the study of Italy, Italian language, literature, thought, history, society and arts in the United Kingdom and Ireland." It does this through publications, conferences and its Annual General Meeting and Colloquium. It also publishes a bi-annual journal called Italian Studies.

=== Association of Professional Italianists in South Africa / Associazione di Professori d’Italiano in Sudafrica (API) ===
The purpose of A.P.I. (Association of Professional Italianists / Associazione Professori d’Italiano), established in 1981 in Johannesburg, is to promote cultural exchanges and discussions on didactic and literary topics concerning the preservation and teaching of the Italian language and literature in Southern Africa both at school and university level, and to keep abreast with international developments in this field.

API publishes a bi-annual journal called Italian Studies in Southern Africa / Studi d’Italianistica nell’Africa Australe (ISSA).

== International scholarly journals ==
=== Annali d’Italianistica ===
Annali d’Italianistica seeks to promote the study of Italian literature in its cultural context, to foster scholarly excellence, and to select topics of interest to a large number of Italianists. Monographic in nature, the journal is receptive to a variety of topics, critical approaches, and theoretical perspectives.

=== Contemporary Italian Politics ===
Contemporary Italian Politics, formerly Bulletin of Italian Politics, is a political science journal aimed at academics and policy makers as well as others with a professional or intellectual interest in the politics of Italy.

=== Forum Italicum ===
Forum Italicum is a peer-reviewed international journal of Italian Studies based at Stony Brook University, NY, US, and founded by M. Ricciardelli in 1967. The journal is intended as a meeting-place where scholars, critics, and teachers can present their views on the literature, language, and culture of Italy and other countries in relation to Italy. Young and hitherto unpublished scholars are encouraged to contribute their critical works.

=== Italian Culture ===
Italian Culture is the official publication of the American Association for Italian Studies and is currently housed at the University of Minnesota and Cornell University. Its interdisciplinary scope reflects the broad and diverse interests of the Association's members, offering subscribers scholarly articles in Italian language, linguistics, history, literature, cinema, politics, philosophy, folklore, popular culture, migration, and the influence of Italy on other cultures. It also includes articles on comparative literature and cultural studies.

=== Italian Poetry Review ===
Italian Poetry Review, is a plurilingual journal of creativity and criticism that is part of a larger cultural program located at Columbia University in the City of New York and associated with the Department of Italian and the Italian Academy for Advanced Studies in America.

=== Italian Quarterly ===
Italian Quarterly is published by the Department of Italian at Rutgers, the State University of New Jersey. The Journal welcomes critical contributions in English or Italian on Italian literature and culture, including film; artistic translations of work of merit; and original work, poetry or prose, in Italian.

=== Modern Italy ===
Modern Italy is the official journal of the Association for the Study of Modern Italy. Founded in 1995, the journal's focus is the history, politics and social, economic and cultural studies of Italy, Italian affairs and the Italian peoples from the eighteenth to the twenty-first century. The journal publishes fully refereed research articles, a regular ‘Contexts and Debates’ section, review articles, book reviews, conference reports and exhibition reviews.

=== Journal of Modern Italian Studies ===
The Journal of Modern Italian Studies (JMIS) is one of the leading English language forums for debate and discussion on modern Italy. This peer-reviewed journal publishes five issues a year, each containing scholarly articles, book reviews and review essays relating to the political, economic, cultural, and social history of modern Italy from 1700 to the present.

=== Spunti e ricerche ===
Spunti e ricerche is an academic journal based in Melbourne founded in 1985 and with a circulation to individuals and libraries in Australia, Europe and North America. Spunti e ricerche's editorial board is composed of Italianists from Melbourne tertiary institutions and is assisted by an advisory board made up of Italianists.

=== The Italianist ===
The Italianist first appeared in 1981, and publishes articles on all aspects of Italian art, culture, and life from the Middle Ages to the present.

=== Quaderni d'Italianistica ===
Quaderni d'Italianistica is the official journal of the CAIS, formerly CSIS (Canadian Society for Italian Studies). Quaderni d'Italianistica is peer-reviewed and publishes two yearly issues of essays and book reviews in English, French, or Italian on any aspect of Italian language, literature, culture and pedagogy. Quaderni also embraces a transnational perspective, addressing questions of race, gender, and diasporic communities.

== See also ==
- Serena Professor of Italian
- Casa Italiana Zerilli Marimò
- Casa Italiana
- Italian Renaissance
