= Spunti e ricerche =

- Discipline: Italian studies
- Language: English, Italian
- Edited by: Raffaele Lampugnani, Annamaria Pagliaro, Antonio Pagliaro, Carolyn James.

Publication details
- History: 1985–present
- Publisher: Spunti e ricerche (Australia)
- Frequency: Annually

Standard abbreviations
- ISO 4: Spunti Ric.

Indexing
- ISSN: 0816-5432 (print); 2200-8942 (web)
- OCLC no.: 800268615

Links
- Journal homepage; Online access; Online archives

Spunti e ricerche is an annual peer-reviewed academic journal that covers research in Italian studies. Individual volumes often consist of articles on a broadly defined theme, on a particular writer, or on various subjects. The editors-in-Chief are Raffaele Lampugnani (Monash University), Annamaria Pagliaro (Monash University), Antonio Pagliaro (La Trobe University), and Carolyn James (Monash University). Although other Australian journals pre-dated Spunti e ricerche, such as the now defunct Altro Polo (1978-1996), Spunti e ricerche is the oldest active academic journal in Australia specifically devoted to Italian studies.

== History ==
Spunti e ricerche was the brain child of a number of tutors from the Italian Department of the University of Melbourne in 1981-1982 and the first volume appeared 1985. It was intended to foster, increase, and diversify Australian research and enquiry into Italian studies, specifically in the fields of Italian literature, politics, linguistics, history, society, cinema, and art, but also had the broad aim to encourage manifestations of the culture by Italians, or about Italians, in Australia.

== Abstracting and indexing ==
Spunti e ricerche is indexed and abstracted in:

- International Bibliography of Book Reviews of Scholarly Literature on the Humanities and Social Sciences
- International Bibliography of Periodical Literature
- MLA International Bibliography
