= Gianni Celati =

Italian writer (1937–2022)

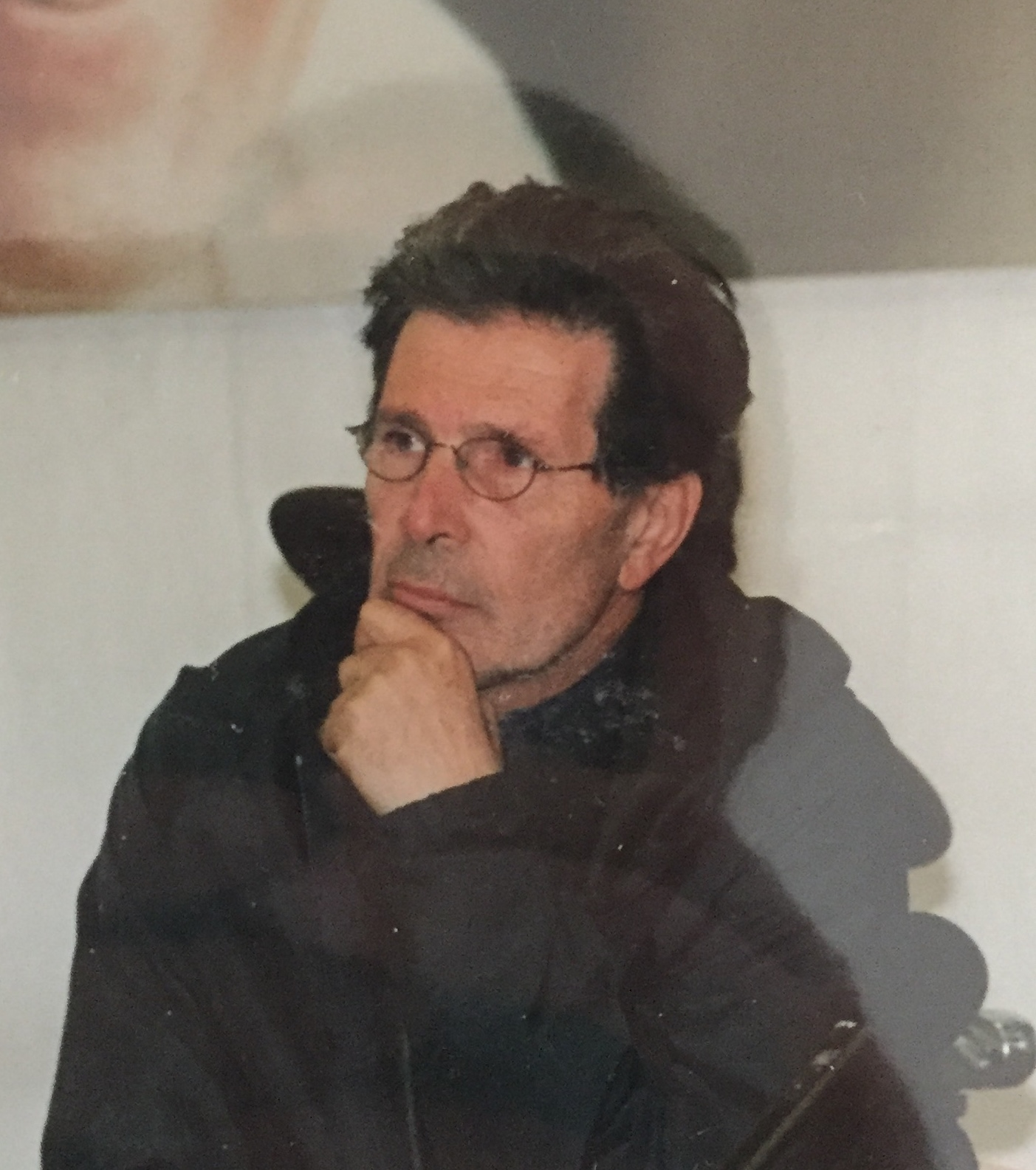
Celati in 2001

Gianni Celati (10 January 1937 – 3 January 2022) was an Italian writer, translator, and literary critic.

== Biography ==
Gianni Celati was born in Sondrio, Italy, but spent his infancy and adolescence in the province of Ferrara. He graduated in English literature with a degree on James Joyce by the teacher Carlo Izzo of the University of Bologna, where he would later teach (he also taught at the Caen University, at Cornell University, and at Brown University).

His first book, Comiche, was published in 1970 in the Giulio Einaudi's publishing company with an introduction by Italo Calvino, with whom he planned to found a literary magazine which never came to light. Another writer interested in the projects was Carlo Ginzburg. All the letters were preserved and published later by the magazine Riga, no. 14 (1998), which later dedicated the entire no. 28 (2008) to Celati.

His three novels Le avventure di Guizzardi (1972), La banda dei sospiri (1976), and Lunario del paradiso (1978) were later published together in Parlamenti buffi (1998), with a leave-letter of the author to his own book, which marked his passage from Einaudi to the Giangiacomo Feltrinelli's publishing company.

In 1985, he wrote the stories of Narratori delle pianure (Grinzane Cavour Prize); in 1987 Quattro novelle sulle apparenze; and in 1989 Verso la foce (Mondello Prize). The three books reveal a new direction in the author's style, more serious and visual after the amusing and explosive wordy manner of the previous ones.

In 1994, he wrote L'Orlando innamorato raccontato in prosa, derived from the Orlando in Love of Matteo Maria Boiardo. In 1998, he collected his notes from African travelling in Avventure in Africa (Feronia Prize). This book was awarded the Zerilli-Marimò Prize for Italian Fiction.

In 2000, Rebecca J. West dedicated her Gianni Celati: The Craft of Everyday Storytelling to his writings (published by University of Toronto Press).

Other stories by Celati were collected in Cinema naturale (2001, Piero Chiara Prize). In 2005, he published the pseudo-anthropological study Fata Morgana (2005, Ennio Flaiano Prize). In 2006, he won the Viareggio Prize for his novel Vite di pascolanti and made the third James K. Binder Lectureship in Literature at the University of California, San Diego on "Fellini on the Italian Male".

Celati has translated works by Jonathan Swift, William Gerhardie, Herman Melville, Stendhal, Louis Ferdinand Céline, Mark Twain, Roland Barthes, Jack London, Henri Michaux, Georges Perec, and others.

He also directed a few documentaries, such as Strada Provinciale delle Anime (1991), Il Mondo di Luigi Ghirri (1999, on the Italian photographer), Case Sparse (2003), and Diol Kadd (2010, shot in Senegal); while he starred in Mondonuovo (2003) by the director Davide Ferrario, a movie on Celati's childhood.

Celati died in Brighton, England on 3 January 2022, at the age of 84.

== Works ==
- Comiche, Einaudi, Turin, 1971 (novel)
- Le avventure del Guizzardi, Einaudi, 1972; Feltrinelli, Milan, 1989; 1994 (novel)
- La banda dei sospiri, Einaudi, 1976; Feltrinelli, 1989; 1998 (novel)
- Finzioni occidentali, Einaudi 1975; 1986; 2001 (essays)
- Lunario del paradiso, Einaudi, 1978; Feltrinelli 1989; 1996 (novel)
- Alice disambientata, L'erba voglio, Milan, 1978; Le lettere, Rome, 2007 (pseudo-essay on Lewis Carroll)
- Narratori delle pianure, Feltrinelli, 1985; 1988; translated by Robert Lumley, Voices from the plains, Serpent's Tail, London, 1989 (stories)
- Quattro novelle sulle apparenze, Feltrinelli, 1987; 1996; translated by Stuart Hood as Appearances, Serpent's Tail, 1991 (stories)
- La farsa dei tre clandestini. Un adattamento dai Marx Brothers, Baskerville, Bologna, 1987 (theatre)
- Verso la foce, Feltrinelli 1988; 1992 (travels)
- Parlamenti buffi, Feltrinelli, 1989 (including Le avventure del Guizzardi, La banda dei sospiri, and Lunario del paradiso)
- L'Orlando innamorato raccontato in prosa, Einaudi, 1994 (rewriting in prose of the classical poem)
- Recita dell'attore Attilio Vecchiatto al teatro di Rio Saliceto, Feltrinelli, 1996 (theatre)
- Avventure in Africa, Feltrinelli 1998;
- Cinema naturale, Feltrinelli 2001; 2003 (stories)
- Fata Morgana, Feltrinelli, 2005 (pseudo-essay)
- Vite di pascolanti, Nottetempo, Rome, 2006 (stories)
- Costumi degli italiani: 1. Un eroe moderno, Quodlibet, Macerata, 2008 (stories)
- Costumi degli italiani: 2. Il benessere arriva in casa Pucci, Quodlibet 2008 (stories)
- Sonetti del Badalucco nell'Italia odierna, Feltrinelli, 2010 (poems as if written by Attilio Vecchiatto, character of the 1996 book and theatrical work)
- Cinema all'aperto, Fandango Libri, 2011 (with DVD)
- Conversazioni del vento volatore, Quodlibet 2011 (interviews)
- Passar la vita a Diol Kadd. Diari 2003-2006, Feltrinelli 2011 (with DVD)
- Selve d'amore, Quodlibet 2013 (stories)

Translations in English

- Adventures in Africa (Avventure in Africa), translated by Adria Bernardi, foreword by Rebecca J. West. Chicago and London: University of Chicago Press, Chicago 2000

== Sources ==
- Rebecca J. West, Gianni Celati: The Craft of Everyday Storytelling, University of Toronto Press, 2000
