= Death in the Making =

1938 book by Robert Capa and Gerda Taro

- Author: Gerda Taro; Robert Capa
- Genre: Photography
- Publisher: Covici-Friede
- Publication date: 1938

Death in the Making is a photographic book by Gerda Taro and Robert Capa that documents the Spanish Civil War. It was published by Covici-Friede while the conflict was still underway in 1938. It is dedicated to Taro, who died in the battlefield the year prior. The book also includes photographs by David Seymour and André Kertész. Though the photographs are credited to Robert Capa, Capa has written that the work was a collective project by both photographers and that the photographs "are interspersed and unattributed." Taro is also thought to have been excluded from authorship for fear that publishers would take a female photographer less seriously. This book helped to cement Capa's and Taro's reputations as leading war photographers and pioneers in photojournalism.

== Description ==
The book's photographs the daily events of the war from the anti-fascist, Republican side of the conflict that battled the Nationalists led by Francisco Franco. The sections of the book include such titles as "The War of the Man on the Street", "Front in Andalusia", and "Women in the War." Journal-like entries accompany the photographs, describing the content of the photographs in a stream of consciousness style.

At age 26, Gerda Taro is purported to be the first female photographer killed in a war front. The book's dedication reads: "For Gerda Taro, who spent one year at the Spanish front – and who stayed on."

== Second edition ==
An updated edition of the book was published in 2020. This new edition includes a full inventory of the photographs, correctly attributing them to their creators.
