= Italian Studies in Southern Africa =

Academic journal

- Discipline: Italian studies
- Language: English, Italian
- Edited by: Anna Meda

Publication details
- History: 1988–present
- Publisher: Association of Professional Italianists in South Africa (South Africa)
- Frequency: Biannually

Standard abbreviations
- ISO 4: Ital. Stud. South. Afr.

Indexing
- ISSN: 1012-2338 (print); 2225-7039 (web)
- OCLC no.: 163157250

Links
- Journal homepage; Online access at AJOL

Italian Studies in Southern Africa/Studi d'Italianistica nell'Africa Australe is a biannual peer-reviewed academic journal published by the Association of Professional Italianists in South Africa/Associazione di Professori d'Italiano in Sudafrica. It is published in Italian and English and covers the field of Italian studies.

The journal is abstracted and indexed in the MLA International Bibliography, Bibliografia Generale della Lingua e della Letteratura Italiana, and Italinemo. It is listed as a journal qualifying authors for research support by the South African Department of Higher Education and Training and the Australian Research Council.

The editor-in-chief is Anna Meda (University of South Africa).
