= Zerilli-Marimò Prize for Italian Fiction =

Zerilli-Marimò / City of Rome Prize for Italian Fiction
- Description: Promoting Italian fiction in North America
- Country: United States / Italy
- Presented by: Casa Italiana Zerilli-Marimò (New York University)
- Website: www.casaitaliananyu.org

The Zerilli-Marimò / City of Rome Prize for Italian Fiction was an Italian American literary award funded by Baroness Mariuccia Zerilli-Marimò. The award winning book is selected as being especially worthy of the attention of readers in North America and the English-speaking world. The prize is sponsored by various organizations, among which New York University, Harvard University, and the Italian Ministry of Foreign Affairs. The jury consists of 70 members who are fluent in Italian, but of non-European nationality.

== Winners of the award ==
- 1998 - Gianni Celati: Avventure in Africa
- 1999 - Marcello Fois: Sempre caro
- 2000 - Giorgio van Straten: Il mio nome a memoria
- 2001 - Roberto Pazzi: Conclave
- 2002 - Alessandra Lavagnino: Le bibliotecarie di Alessandria
- 2003 - Silvia Bonucci: Voci d'un tempo
- 2006 - Valeria Parrella: Per grazia ricevuta
- 2008 - Milena Agus: Mal di pietre
- 2010 - Helena Janeczek: Le rondini di Montecassino
- 2012 - Nicola Gardini: Le parole perdute di Amelia Lynd
