= Hondura de Huebra =

Village in Salamanca, Spain

Coordinates: 40.6421°N 5.9137°W

Hondura de Huebra is a small village in the Barbalos municipality of Salamanca, Spain.
