= Cornell Capa =

Hungarian American photographer (1918–2008)

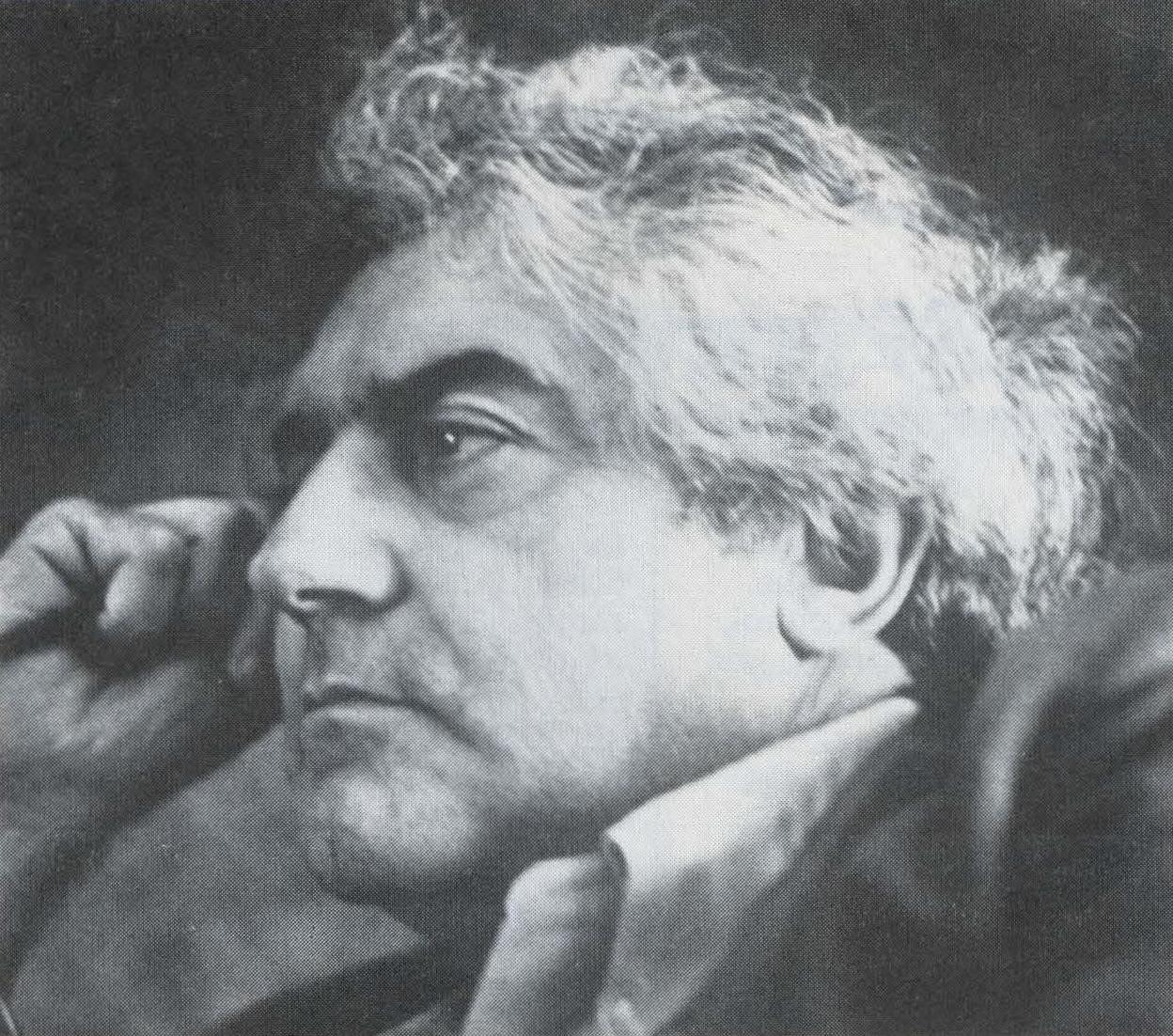
- Capa circa 1980
- Born: Kornél Friedmann; April 10, 1918; Budapest, Austria-Hungary
- Died: May 23, 2008 (aged 90); New York, U.S.
- Known for: Photography, curator
- Movement: Photography, art

Cornell Capa (/ˈkɑːpə/; born Kornél Friedmann; April 10, 1918 – May 23, 2008) was a Hungarian-American photographer, member of Magnum Photos, photo curator, and the younger brother of photo-journalist and war photographer Robert Capa. Graduating from Imre Madách Gymnasium in Budapest, he initially intended to study medicine, but instead joined his brother in Paris to pursue photography. Cornell was an ambitious photo enthusiast who founded the International Center of Photography in New York in 1974 with help from Micha Bar-Am after a stint of working for both Life magazine and Magnum Photos.

== Life ==
Born as Kornél Friedmann in Budapest, he moved, aged 18, to Paris to work with his elder brother Robert Capa, a photo-journalist. In 1937, Cornell Capa moved to New York City to work in the Life magazine darkroom. After serving in the U.S. Air Force, Capa became a Life staff photographer in 1946. The many covers that Capa shot for the magazine included portraits of television personality Jack Paar, painter Grandma Moses, and Clark Gable.

In 1953 he visited Venezuela to make a photo-report of Caracas, on this trip he had the opportunity to photograph the artist Armando Reverón.

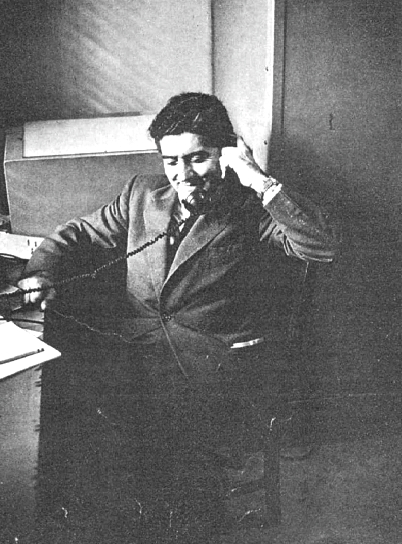
Capa in 1954

In May 1954, his brother Robert Capa was killed by a landmine, while covering the final years of the First Indochina War. Cornell Capa joined Magnum Photos, the photo agency co-founded by Robert, the same year. For Magnum, Cornell Capa covered the Soviet Union, Israeli Six-Day War, and American politicians.

Beginning in 1967, Capa mounted a series of exhibits and books entitled The Concerned Photographer. The exhibits led to his establishment in 1974 of the International Center of Photography in New York City. Capa served for many years as the director of the center. Capa has published several collections of his photographs including JFK for President, a series of photographs of the 1960 presidential campaign that he took for Life magazine. Capa also produced a book documenting the first 100 days of the Kennedy presidency, with fellow Magnum photographers including Henri Cartier-Bresson and Elliott Erwitt.

Capa died in New York City on May 23, 2008, of natural causes at the age of 90.

== Works ==
Capa's work is often considered quite eclectic, capturing moments as large of scale as wars to everyday subtle gestures of life, from the Six-Day War to children playing stick ball in the street. Capa wrote, "It took me some time to realize that the camera is a mere tool, capable of many uses, and at last I understood that, for me, its role, its power, and its duty are to comment, describe, provoke discussion, awaken conscience, evoke sympathy, spotlight human misery and joy which otherwise would pass unseen, un-understood and unnoticed. I have been interested in photographing the everyday life of my fellow humans and the commonplace spectacle of the world around me, and in trying to distill out of these their beauty and whatever is of permanent interest."

Capa, for Life magazine, was the first to publish a photo essay of the five missionaries killed by the Waodani, known as Operation Auca, in the eastern rain forest of Ecuador in 1956 that made world headlines.

In 1968 Capa published a book called The Concerned Photographer. As evidenced in his work, this title sums up his approach to photojournalism. Among the many events and causes Capa documented were the oppression of the Perón regime in Argentina and the subsequent revolution, Israel's Six-Day War, the plight of the Russian Orthodox Church under Soviet rule, and the education of intellectually disabled children. He also took great interest in politics and documented the presidential campaigns of Adlai Stevenson and John F. Kennedy, along with Kennedy's first one hundred days in office.

Capa wrote forewords to several collections of his brother's photographs and was known to be protective of Robert Capa's memory and reputation. For example, when Robert Capa's famous image of a falling Spanish soldier during the Spanish Civil War was claimed to be a fake and not taken at the moment of death, Cornell Capa entered into a long battle to establish the legitimacy of the photograph, including tracking down the name of the soldier and his date of death.

== Awards ==
- Honor Award from the American Society of Magazine Photographers (1975)
- Leica Medal of Excellence (1986)
- Peace and Culture Award, Sokka Gakkai International, Japan (1990)
- The Cultural Award from the German Society for Photography (DGPh), along with Sue Davies and Anna Farova (1990)
- The Order of the Arts and Letters, France (1991)
- The Royal Photographic Society's Centenary Medal and Honorary Fellowship (HonFRPS) in recognition of a sustained, significant contribution to the art of photography in 1994.
- The Distinguished Career in Photography Award from the Friends of Photography (1995)
- Lifetime Achievement Award in Photography from the Aperture Foundation (1999)
