= Alina Marazzi =

Italian film director

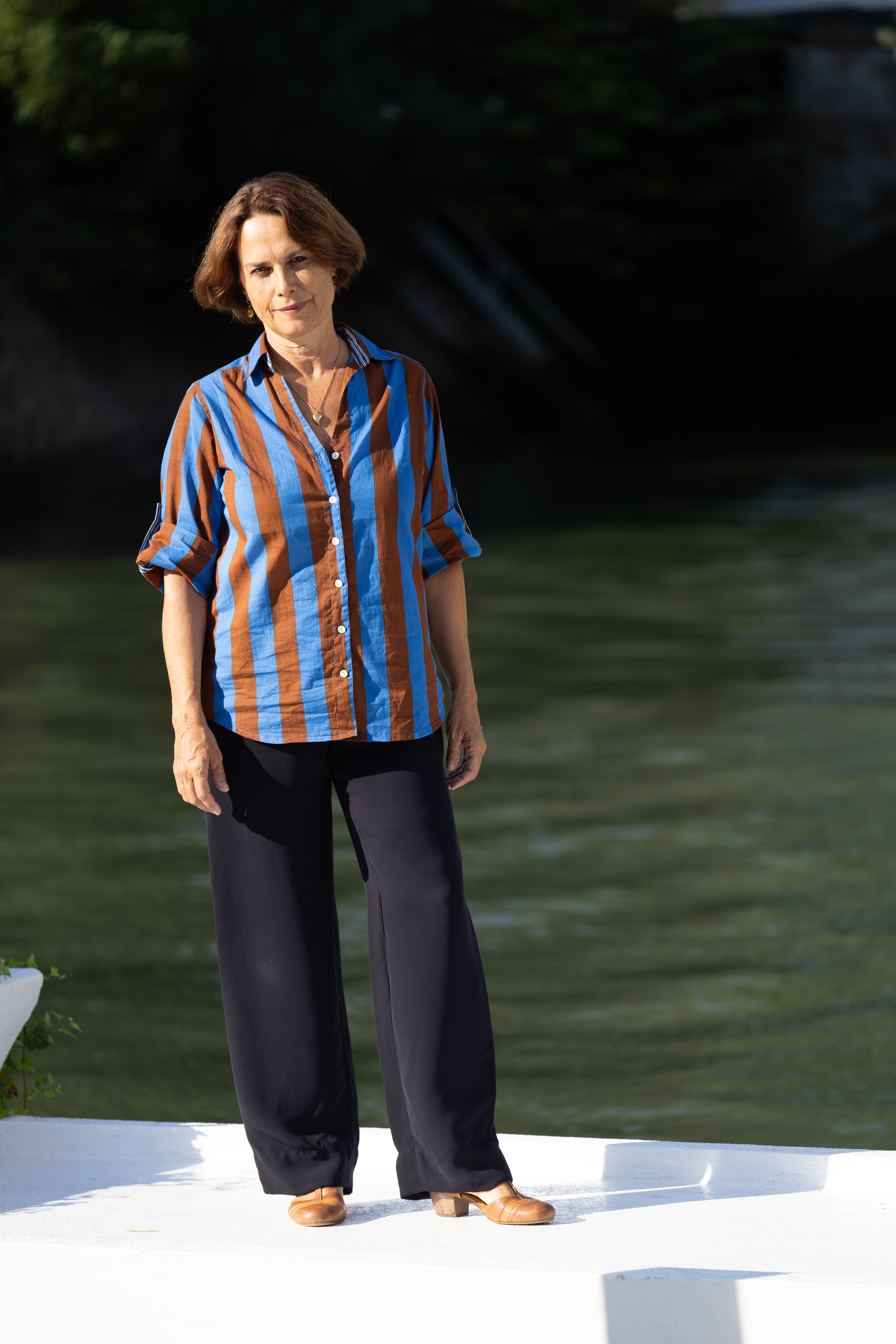
- Marazzi in 2026
- Born: Milan
- Occupation: Film director

Alina Marazzi is an Italian filmmaker, most known for her drama film The Girl with the Leica (2026).

== Life ==
Marazzi was born in Milan. Her mother, Luisa known as Liseli, was mentally ill and took her own life when her daughter was seven. This became the subject of Marazzi's film Un'ora sola ti vorrei/For One More Hour with You, although the film captured events from 1926 to 1972. She took her first degree in the United Kingdom.

In 2007 she completed "Vogliamo anche le rose/We Want Roses Too" which was part of three documentary films she had made. This film was shown on BBC4 in the UK. The films investigated how Italian women reacted to their changing role up to the 1970s when divorce, abortion and sexuality were no longer taboo subjects. Her films also look at motherhood using her grandfather's cine films of her own childhood. Her film Tutto parla di te starred Charlotte Rampling in 2012.

She was a visiting fellow at Warwick University in 2014 where she talked about her films and the role of gender.

== Selected works ==
- Un'ora sola ti vorrei/For One More Hour with You
- Per Sempre/Forever (2005)
- We Want Roses Too (2007)
- Tutto parla di te (2012)
- The Girl with the Leica (2026)
