= A Russian Journal =

1948 book by John Steinbeck

- First edition
- Author: John Steinbeck
- Language: English
- Genre: travel, non-fiction
- Publisher: Viking Press
- Publication date: 1948
- Publication place: United States
- Media type: Print
- Pages: 205

A Russian Journal, published by John Steinbeck in April 1948, is an eyewitness account of his travels through the Soviet Union during the early years of the Cold War era. Accompanied by the distinguished war photographer Robert Capa, Steinbeck set out with the intent to record the real attitudes and modes of existence of people living under Soviet rule. As Steinbeck explained it, the book's goal was "honest reporting, to set down what we saw and heard without editorial comment, without drawing conclusions about things we didn't know sufficiently."

This literary and photographic record of life under Joseph Stalin's rule is a historical document. Steinbeck and Capa portray Soviet people as living in extremely different conditions from those in the reports among the West of the day: life in the cities and the country appears peaceful and very similar to that of other peoples in Europe at the time. Without diminishing the authoritarian nature of the Soviet Union, Steinbeck claimed that the main fear held by average Russians was not of Stalin but another World War.

During their short trip to the Soviet Union, Steinbeck and Capa visited Moscow, Kyiv, Stalingrad and Soviet Georgia.

During his visit to Kyiv, Steinbeck was shocked by the war's devastation in Ukraine, and to convey it to Americans, wrote:

If the United States were completely destroyed from New York to Kansas, we would have about the area of destruction the Ukraine has. If six million people were killed, not counting soldiers, fifteen per cent of the population, you would have an idea of the casualties of the Ukraine. Counting soldiers, there would be many more, but six million out of forty-five million civilians have been killed. There are mines which never opened because the Germans threw thousands of bodies down into the shafts.
