= Helena Janeczek =

Italian novelist of German origin (born 1964)

Helena Janeczek (born 1964) is an Italian novelist of Polish Jewish origin.

== Life and career ==
Helena Janeczek was born in Munich, Germany, to a Polish family of Jews who survived the Holocaust. She moved to Italy when she was 19 and has lived there ever since. Her first book, Lezioni di tenebra (Lessons of Darkness), was published in 1997. It was a retelling of her family history and followed her journey with her mother to Auschwitz, where her mother was detained during World War II.

Her 2010 novel, Le rondini di Montecassino (Montecassino's Swallows), won the Zerilli-Marimò Prize for Italian Fiction. It follows a group of soldiers fighting in the Battle of Monte Cassino during World War II.

In 2017, she published her novel La ragazza con la Leica (The Girl with the Leica), about photographer Gerda Taro who died during the Spanish Civil War. In 2018, she won the Strega Prize, the most prestigious Italian prize for literature, for the novel, the first time in 15 years a woman had won the prize since Melania Mazzucco in 2003.

== Bibliography ==
- Ins Freie: Gedichte (1989)
- Lezioni di tenebra (1997) ISBN 8804430036
- Cibo (2001) ISBN 880450059X
- Le rondini di Montecassino (2010) ISBN 8860889456
  - The Swallows of Monte Cassino (2013) ISBN 9780989916905
- Bloody Cow (2012) ISBN 8842818674
- La ragazza con la Leica (2017) ISBN 8823518350,
  - The Girl with the Leica (2019) ISBN 9781609455477
- Il tempo degli imprevisti (2024) ISBN 9788823529120.
