= Casa Italiana Zerilli-Marimò =

Department of New York University

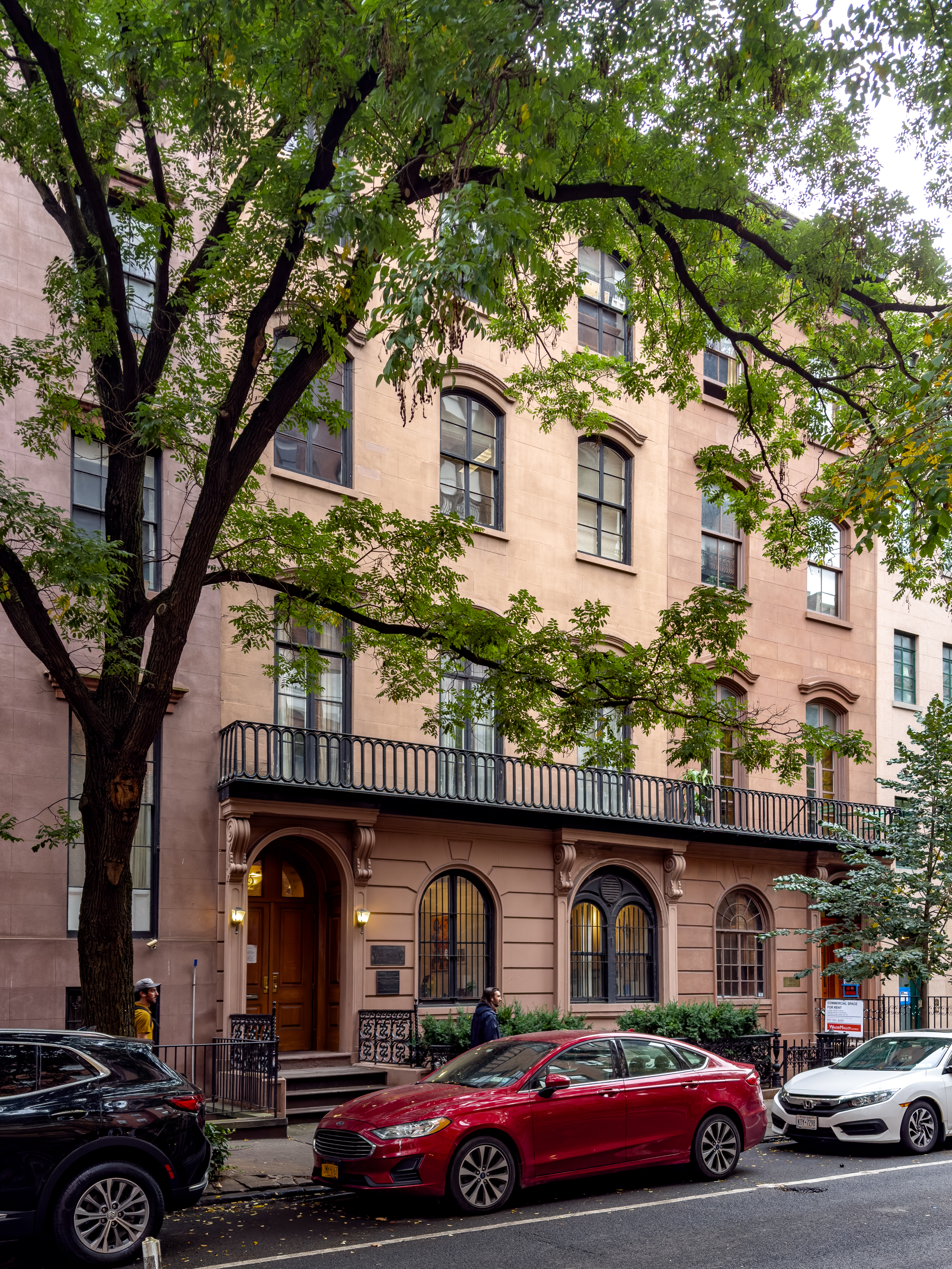
(2024)

Casa Italiana Zerilli-Marimò at New York University is an academic and public cultural center based in New York City dedicated to advancing the understanding and study of Italian culture through free events and sustained dialogue between Italy and the United States. Founded in 1990 by Baroness Mariuccia Zerilli-Marimò, Casa Italiana is also the home of the Department of Italian Studies at New York University. It is located in the General Winfield Scott House at 24 West 12th Street in Manhattan.

Casa Italiana organizes over 120 free public programs a year, including lectures, conferences, film screenings, concerts, theatrical events, exhibitions, and interdisciplinary discussions. Its activities address Italian language, literature, cinema, music, visual arts, politics, economics, and social issues, with an emphasis on both historical perspectives and contemporary Italy.

Serving as a bridge between academic research and public cultural life, Casa Italiana fosters dialogue between Italy and the United States, bringing together Italian and American scholars, artists, international students, and members of the general public. It is recognized as a leading authority on Italian culture in New York City and the United States.

== History ==
Casa Italiana Zerilli-Marimò was founded in 1990 thanks to a donation from the Baroness Mariuccia Zerilli-Marimò, in memory of her husband Guido Zerilli-Marimò.

In 1988, Baroness Zerilli-Marimò’s donation enabled the purchase and restoration of this 19th-century historical landmark building in Greenwich Village. NYU’s President Dr. Brademas, during the project announcement, commended her vision for fostering cultural ties with Italy’s rich heritage. Baroness Zerilli-Marimò intended this venture as a permanent homage to her husband, Guido Zerilli-Marimò, and a means of enhancing knowledge of Italian culture in the United States.

Inaugurated in 1990, Casa Italiana also provided a prestigious home that allowed the foundation and growth of the Department of Italian Studies, now one of the largest and most prestigious in North America. Casa Italiana began offering a diverse array of public cultural events under the Direction of James Ziskin. Professor Stefano Albertini, who took over in 1998, transformed it into a prominent center for cultural discourse in New York City, contributing to NYU’s status as a global leader in European and international studies. Owing to the generosity of its Founder, and its affiliation with a prominent institution of higher education, Casa Italiana has risen to prominence as a renowned Italian cultural center.

== Mission ==
Casa Italiana Zerilli-Marimò was founded with the specific intent of spreading Italian culture outside of its national boundaries. The Center offers cultural events pertinent to Italian culture, including art exhibits, concerts, lectures, film screenings, literary presentations and awards. The ground floor serves as an art gallery.

The programs of Casa Italiana deal with literature, cinema and political and social reflection.

Casa Italiana Zerilli-Marimò houses and involves itself with Italian artists, scholars and politicians, whose presence engages new points of discussion, opening and encouraging dialogue with Americans on Italian life and culture.

Casa Italiana collaborates with Italian centers and institutes, both public and private, developing a program of extracurricular cultural events that embraces literary, musical, and artistic events.

== Directors ==
- Professor Luigi Ballarini (1990–1993)
- Professor James Ziskin (1993–1998)
- Professor Stefano Albertini (1998–today)

== See also ==
- The Zerilli-Marimò Prize for Italian Fiction
- Villa La Pietra
