= Escurial de la Sierra =

- Municipality
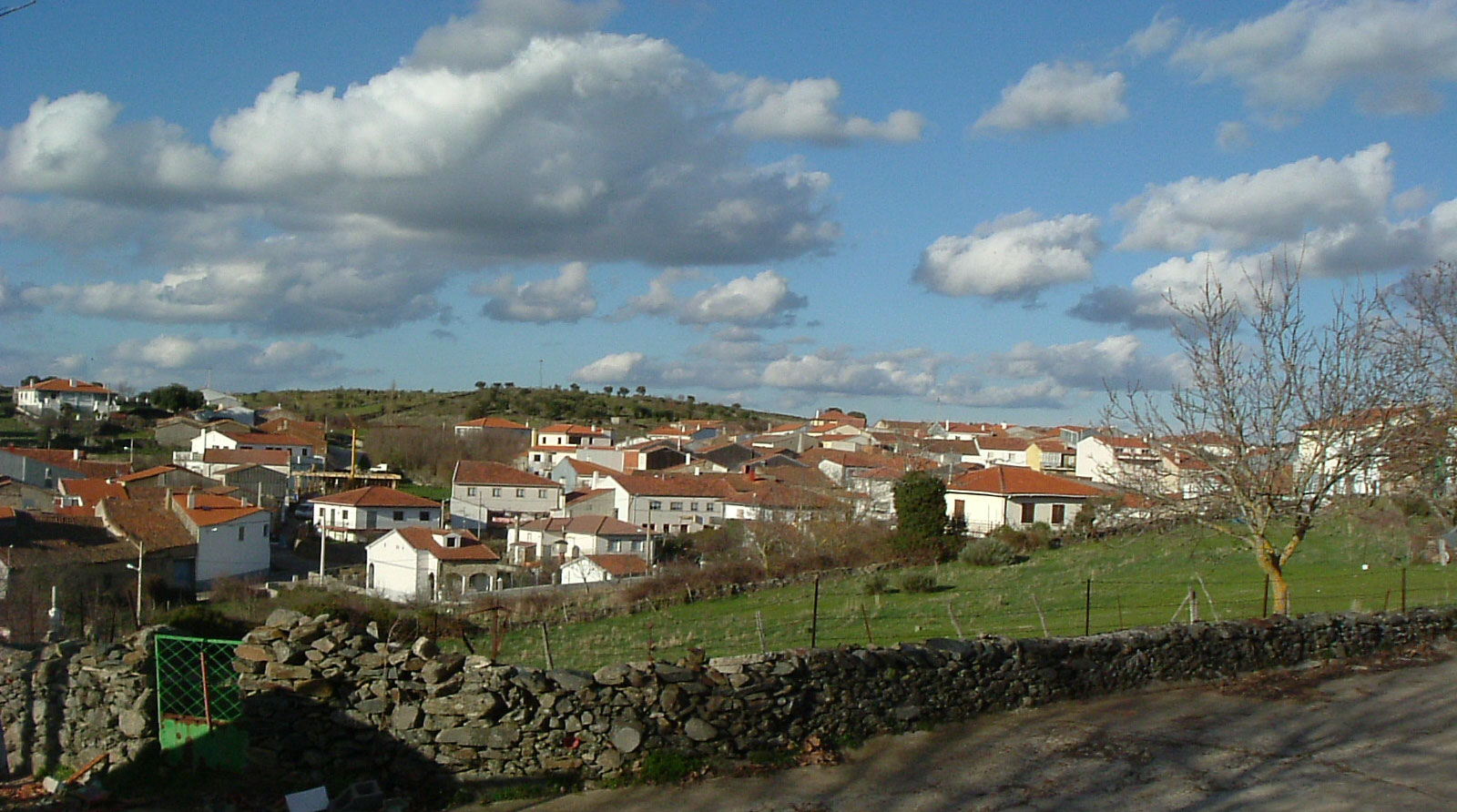
- View of Escurial de la Sierra from its church

- Coat of arms

- Location in Salamanca

- Location in Spain
- Coordinates: 40°37′N 5°57′W
- Country: Spain
- Autonomous community: Castile and León
- Province: Salamanca
- Comarca: Sierra de Francia

Area
  - Total: 21 km^{2} (8.1 sq mi)
- Elevation: 963 m (3,159 ft)

Population (2025-01-01)
  - Total: 233
  - Density: 11/km^{2} (29/sq mi)
- Time zone: UTC+1 (CET)
  - Summer (DST): UTC+2 (CEST)
- Postal code: 37762

Escurial de la Sierra is a village and municipality in the province of Salamanca, western Spain, part of the autonomous community of Castile-Leon. It is located 58 kilometres (36 mi) from the provincial capital city of Salamanca and has a population of 246 people.

== Geography ==
The municipality covers an area of 21 km^{2} (8.1 sq mi).

It lies 963 metres (3,159 ft) above sea level.

== Economy ==
- The basis of the economy is agriculture.
