= Robert Capa =

Hungarian-American photographer (1913–1954)

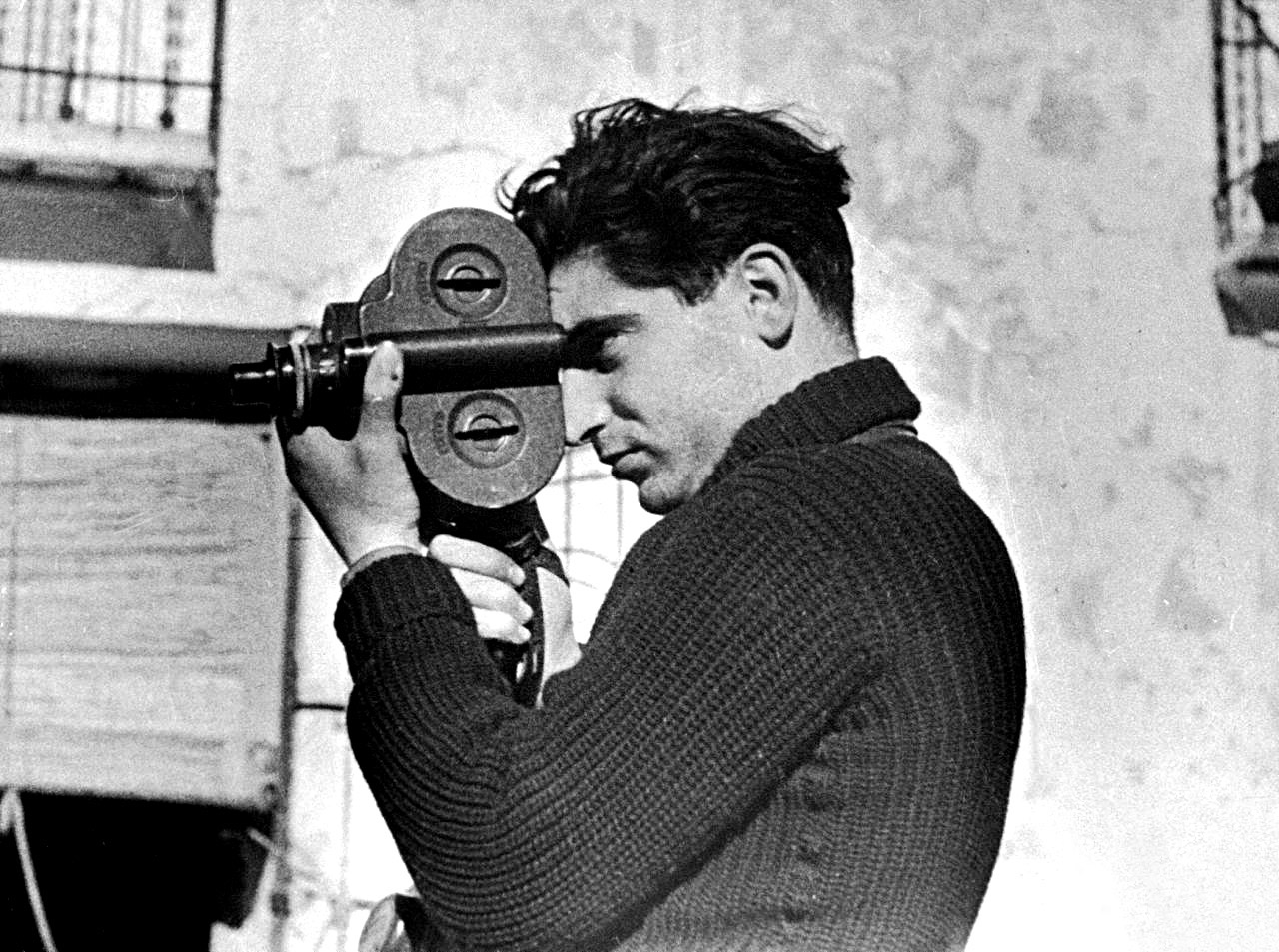
- Capa on assignment in Spain, using a Eyemo 35 mm movie camera, photographed by Gerda Taro
- Born: Endre Ernő Friedmann; October 22, 1913; Budapest, Austria-Hungary
- Died: May 25, 1954 (aged 40); Thái Bình Province, French Indochina
- Known for: War photography

Robert Capa (/ˈkɑːpə/; born Endre Ernő Friedmann, Hungarian: [ˈɛndrɛ ˈɛrnøː ˈfridmɒn]; October 22, 1913 – May 25, 1954) was a Hungarian-American war photographer and photojournalist. He is considered by some to be the greatest combat and adventure photographer in history.

Friedman fled political repression in Hungary when he was a teenager. He moved to Berlin, where he enrolled in college. He witnessed Adolf Hitler's rise to power, which led him to move to Paris. There he met and began to work with his professional partner Gerda Taro, and they began to publish their work separately. Capa's close friendship with David Seymour-Chim was captured in Martha Gellhorn's novella Two by Two. He subsequently covered five wars: the Spanish Civil War, the Second Sino-Japanese War, World War II across Europe, the 1948 Arab–Israeli War, and the First Indochina War, with his photos published in major magazines and newspapers.

During his career he risked his life numerous times, most dramatically as the only civilian photographer landing on Omaha Beach on D-Day. He documented the course of World War II in London, North Africa, Italy, and the liberation of Paris. His friends and colleagues included Ernest Hemingway, Irwin Shaw, John Steinbeck and director John Huston.

In 1947, for his work recording World War II in pictures, U.S. general Dwight D. Eisenhower awarded Capa the Medal of Freedom. That same year, Capa co-founded Magnum Photos in Paris. The organization was the first cooperative agency for worldwide freelance photographers. Hungary has issued a stamp and a gold coin in his honor.

He was killed when he stepped on a landmine in Vietnam in 1954, aged 40.

== Early years ==
Capa was born Endre Ernő Friedmann to the Jewish family of Júlia (née Berkovits) and Dezső Friedmann in Budapest, Austria-Hungary, on October 22, 1913. His mother Julianna Henrietta Berkovits was a native of Nagykapos (now Veľké Kapušany, Slovakia) and his father came from the Transylvanian village Csucsa (now Ciucea, Romania). At the age of 18, he was accused of alleged communist sympathies and was forced to flee Hungary.

He moved to Berlin and enrolled at Berlin University, where he worked part-time as a darkroom assistant, and then became a staff photographer for the German photographic agency Dephot. It was during that period that the Nazi Party came into power, which made Capa, a Jew, decide to leave Germany and move to Paris.

== Career ==
Capa's first published photograph was of Leon Trotsky making a speech in Copenhagen on "The Meaning of the Russian Revolution" in 1932.

After moving to Paris, he became professionally involved with Gerta Pohorylle, later known as Gerda Taro, a German-Jewish photographer who had moved to Paris for the same reasons he did. The two of them decided to work under the alias Capa at this time, and she contributed to much of the early work. However, the two of them later separated aliases, with Pohorylle quickly creating her own alias 'Gerda Taro', and began publishing their work independently. Capa and Taro developed a romantic relationship alongside their professional one. Capa proposed and Taro refused, but they continued their involvement. He also shared a darkroom with French photographer Henri Cartier-Bresson, with whom he would later co-found the Magnum Photos cooperative.

=== Spanish Civil War, 1936 ===
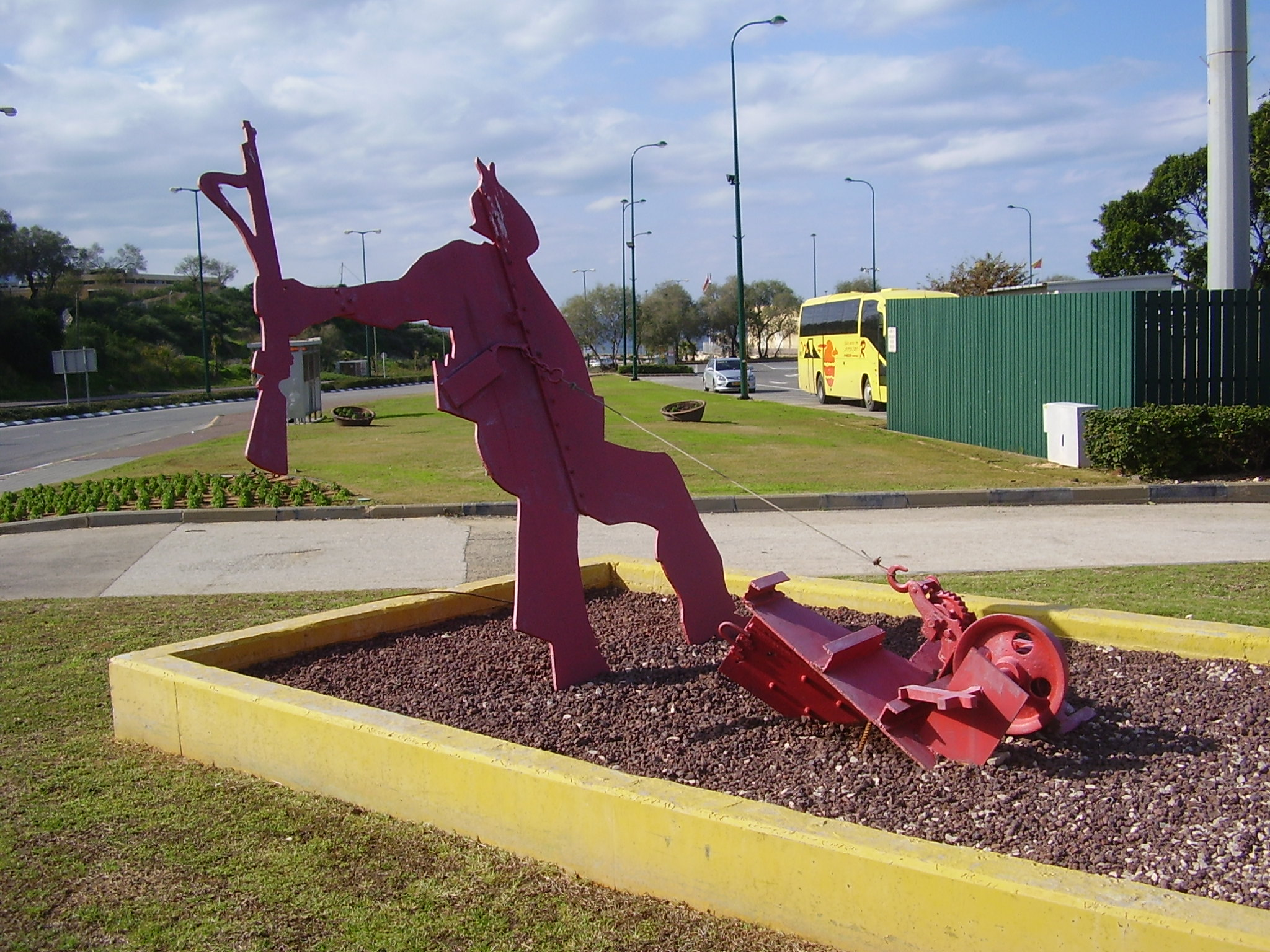
A sculpture by Igael Tumarkin inspired by The Falling Soldier

From 1936 to 1939, Capa worked in Spain, photographing the Spanish Civil War, along with Taro and David Seymour.

It was during that war that Capa took the photo now called The Falling Soldier (1936), purported to show the death of a Republican soldier. The photo was published in magazines in France and then by Life and Picture Post. The authenticity of the photo was later questioned, with evidence including other photos from the scene suggesting it was staged. (Note: The authenticity of the photograph is today in doubt, with some questioning its location, the identity of its subject, and the discovery of staged photographs taken at the same time and place.) Picture Post, a pioneering photojournalism magazine published in the United Kingdom, had once described then twenty-five year old Capa as "the greatest war photographer in the world."

The next year, in 1937, Taro died when the motor vehicle on which she was traveling (apparently standing on the footboard) collided with an out-of-control tank. She had been returning from a photographic assignment covering the Battle of Brunete. In a new introduction to Capa's autobiography, Slightly Out of Focus, Richard Whelan, a biographer of Capa, wrote that Capa "never fully recovered from his grief."

Capa accompanied then-journalist and author Ernest Hemingway to photograph the war, which Hemingway later described in his novel, For Whom the Bell Tolls (1940). Life magazine published an article about Hemingway and his time in Spain, along with numerous photos by Capa.

In December 2007, three boxes filled with rolls of film, containing 4,500 35mm negatives of the Spanish Civil War by Capa, Taro, and Chim (David Seymour), which had been considered lost since 1939, were discovered in Mexico. (Note: Attributed to multiple sources:) In 2011, Trisha Ziff directed a film about those images, entitled The Mexican Suitcase.

All you could do was to help individuals caught up in war, try to raise their spirits for a moment, perhaps flirt a little, make them laugh; ... and you could photograph them, to let them know that somebody cared.

— Robert Capa

=== Chinese resistance to Imperial Japan, 1938 ===
In 1938, he traveled to the Chinese city of Hankou, now within Wuhan, to document the resistance to the Japanese invasion. He sent his images to Life magazine, which published some of them in its May 23, 1938, issue.

=== World War II ===
At the start of World War II, Capa was in New York City, having moved there from Paris to look for work, and to escape Nazi persecution. During the war, Capa was sent to various parts of the European Theatre on photography assignments. He first photographed for Collier's Weekly, before switching to Life after he was fired by Collier's. He was the only "enemy alien" photographer for the Allies. On October 7, 1943, Robert Capa was in Naples with Life reporter Will Lang Jr., and there he photographed the Naples post office bombing.

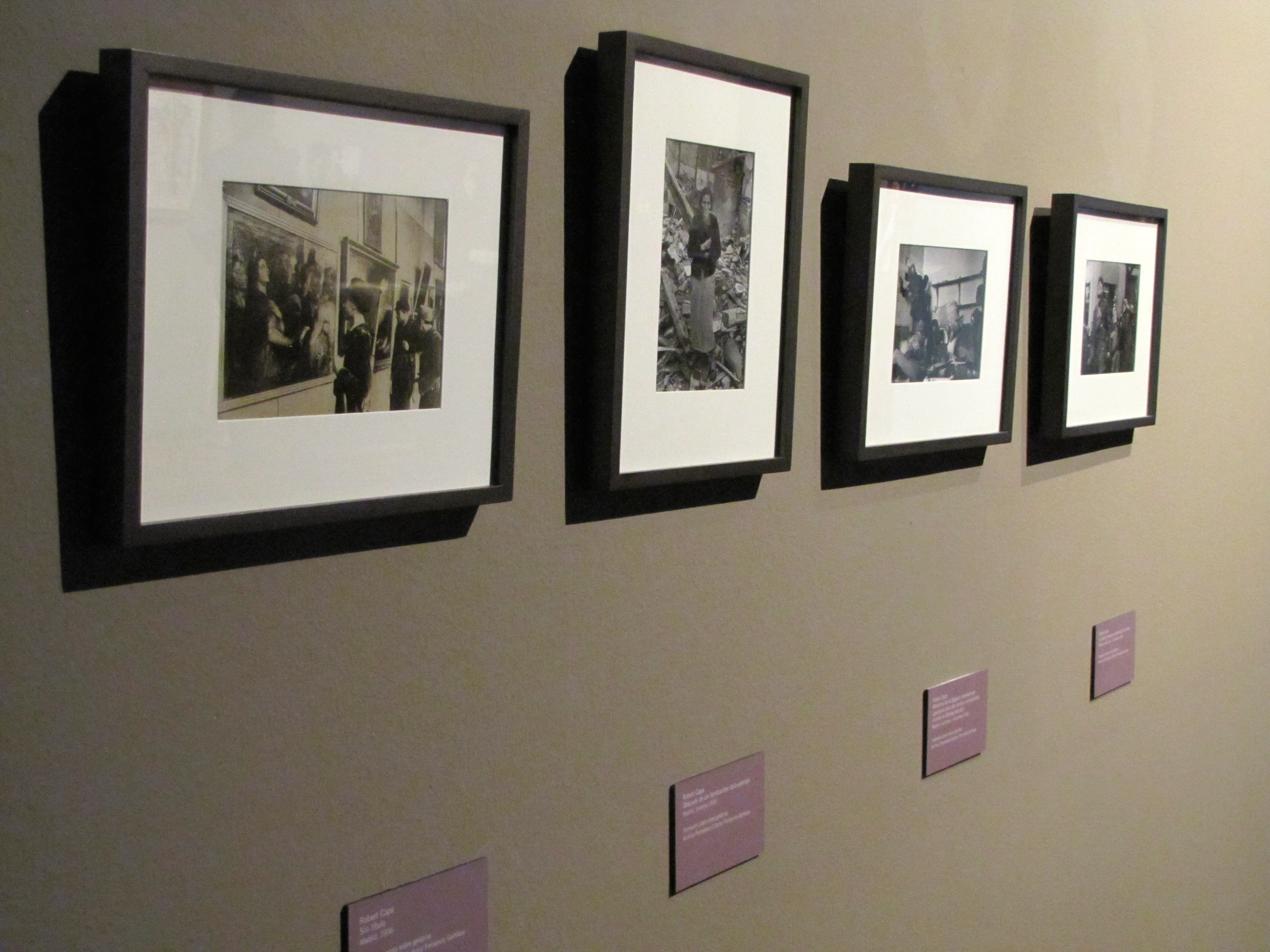
A display of some of Capa's works

==== D-Day, Omaha beach, 1944 ====
A group of images known as "The Magnificent Eleven" were taken by Capa on D-Day. Taking part in the Allied invasion, Capa was attached to the 16th Infantry Regiment, 1st Infantry Division ("Big Red One") on Omaha Beach. The US personnel attacking Omaha Beach faced some of the heaviest resistance from German troops inside the bunkers of the Atlantic Wall. Photographic historian A. D. Coleman has suggested that Capa traveled to the beach in the same landing craft as Colonel George A. Taylor, commander of the 16th Infantry Regiment, who landed 1½ hours after the first wave, near Colleville-sur-Mer.

Capa subsequently stated that he took 106 pictures, but later discovered that all but 11 had been destroyed. This incident may have been caused by Capa's cameras becoming waterlogged at Normandy, although the more frequent allegation is that a young assistant accidentally destroyed the pictures while they were being developed at the photo lab in London. However, this narrative has been challenged by Coleman and others. In 2016, John G. Morris, who was picture editor at the London bureau of Life in 1944, agreed that it was more likely that Capa captured 11 images in total on D-Day. The 11 prints were included in Life magazine's issue on June 19, 1944, with captions written by magazine staffers, as Capa did not provide Life with notes or a verbal description of what they showed.

The captions have since been shown to be erroneous, as were subsequent descriptions of the images by Capa himself. For example, men described by Life as infantrymen taking cover behind a hedgehog obstacle during the assault landing were in fact members of Gap Assault Team 10 – a combined US Navy/US Army demolition unit tasked with blowing up obstacles and clearing the way for landing craft after the beach had been secured.

==== The Shaved Woman of Chartres ====
Capa took photographs during the Allied invasion of France in 1944. His picture The Shaved Woman of Chartres, taken on August 16, 1944, shows a woman whose head has been shaved as a punishment for collaboration with the Nazis.

==== The Picture of the Last Man to Die ====
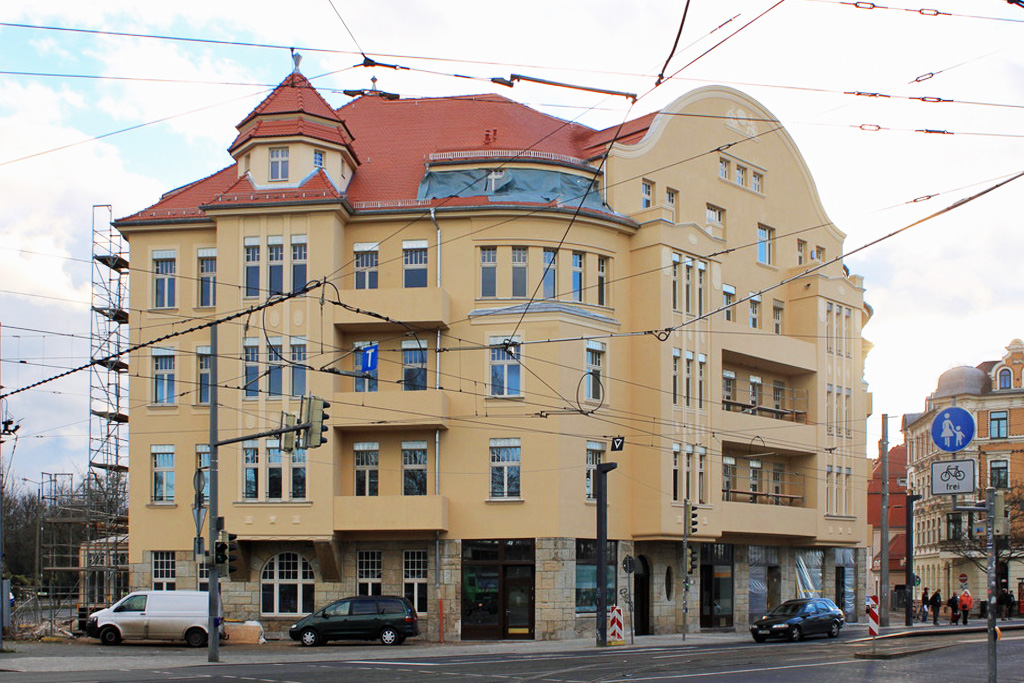
Capa House in Leipzig 2015

On April 18, 1945, Capa captured images of a fight to secure a bridge in Leipzig, Germany. These pictures included an image of Raymond J. Bowman's death by sniper fire. This image was published in a spread in Life magazine with the caption "The picture of the last man to die."

=== Post-war Soviet Union, 1947 ===
In 1947 Capa traveled to the Soviet Union with his friend, the American writer John Steinbeck. They originally met when they shared a room in an Algiers hotel with other war correspondents before the Allied invasion of Italy in 1943. They reconnected in New York, where Steinbeck told him he was thinking about visiting the Soviet Union, now that the war was over.

Capa suggested they go there together and collaborate on a book, with Capa documenting the war-torn nation with photographs. The trip resulted in Steinbeck's A Russian Journal, which was published both as a book and a syndicated newspaper serial. Photos were taken in Moscow, Kyiv, Tbilisi, Batumi and among the ruins of Stalingrad. They remained good friends until Capa's death; Steinbeck took the news of Capa's death very hard.

=== Magnum Photos agency, 1947 ===
In 1947, Capa founded the cooperative venture Magnum Photos in Paris with Henri Cartier-Bresson, William Vandivert, David Seymour, and George Rodger. It was a cooperative agency to manage work for and by freelance photographers, and developed a reputation for the excellence of its photo-journalists. In 1952, he became the president, and held the position until his death in 1954.

=== Founding of Israel, 1948 ===
Capa toured Israel during its founding and while it was being attacked by neighboring states. He took the numerous photographs that accompanied Irwin Shaw's book, Report on Israel.

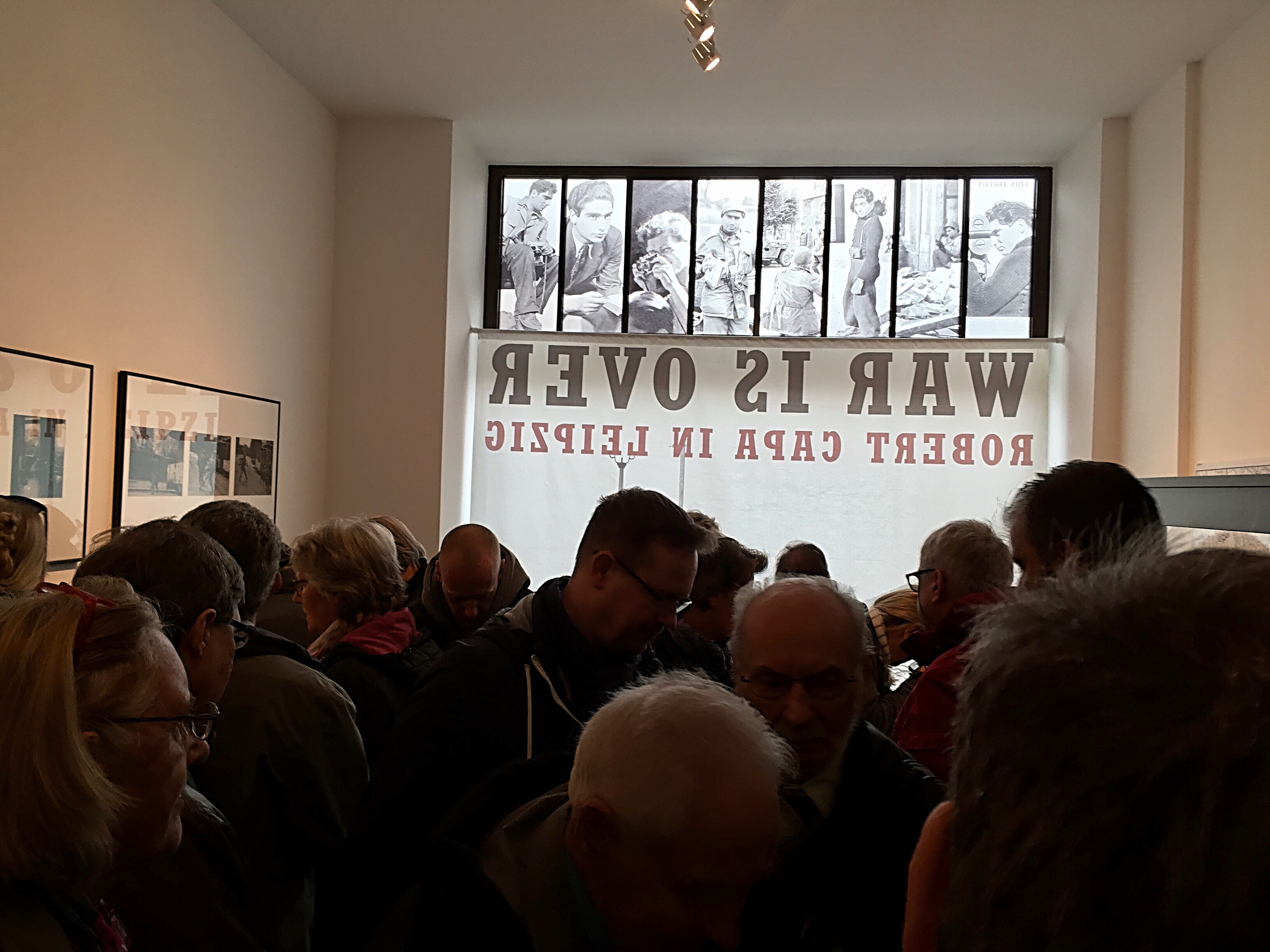
People gathered to view Capa's work in the Capa-House

=== Documenting film productions, 1953 ===
In 1953 he joined screenwriter Truman Capote and director John Huston in Italy where Capa was assigned to photograph the making of the film, Beat the Devil. During their off time they, and star Humphrey Bogart, enjoyed playing poker.

Capa also acted in the film Temptation (1946 film), playing a supporting role. Allegedly, Capa received the part after visiting his friend Charles Korvin on the set. Capa claimed that he could play the part better than the actor who had originally been cast, and after speaking with the director was cast in the final film.

=== First Indochina War and death, 1954 ===
In the early 1950s, Capa travelled to Japan for an exhibition associated with Magnum Photos. While there, Life magazine asked him to go on assignment to Southeast Asia, where the French had been fighting for eight years in the First Indochina War. Although he had claimed a few years earlier that he was finished with war, Capa accepted the job. He accompanied a French regiment located in Thái Bình Province with two Time-Life journalists, John Mecklin and Jim Lucas. On May 25, 1954, the regiment was passing through a dangerous area under fire when Capa decided to leave his jeep and go up the road to photograph the advance. Capa was killed when he stepped on a landmine near the road.

== Personal life ==
Capa was born into a middle-class Jewish family in Budapest, where his parents were tailors. Capa's mother was a successful fashion shop owner, and his father was a tailor in her shop. Capa had two brothers: a younger brother, photographer Cornell Capa and an older brother, László Friedmann.

At the age of 18, Capa moved to Vienna, later relocated to Prague, and finally settled in Berlin: all cities that were centers of artistic and cultural ferment in this period. He studied at the Deutsche Hochschule für Politik from 1931 until 1933, when the Nazi Party instituted restrictions on Jews and banned them from universities. He then moved to Paris and in 1934 met Gerda Pohorylle, a German Jewish refugee. "André Friedman", as he called himself then, taught Gerda photography, and together they created the name and image of "Robert Capa". At that time, both photographers published their work under the pseudonym of Robert Capa. Gerda later took the name Gerda Taro and became successful in her own right. She travelled with Capa to Spain in 1936 intending to document the Spanish Civil War. In July 1937, Capa traveled briefly to Paris while Gerda remained in Madrid. She was killed near Brunete during a battle. Capa, who was reportedly engaged to her, was deeply shocked and never married.

In February 1943, Capa met Elaine Justin. They fell in love and the relationship lasted until the end of the war. Capa spent most of his time on the front line. Capa called the redheaded Elaine "Pinky," and wrote about her in his war memoir, Slightly Out of Focus. In 1945, Elaine Justin broke up with Capa; she later married Chuck Romine. Some months later, Capa became the lover of the actress Ingrid Bergman, who was touring in Europe to entertain American soldiers.^{p. 176} In December 1945, Capa followed her to Hollywood. The relationship ended in the summer of 1946 when Capa traveled to Turkey.

== Legacy ==
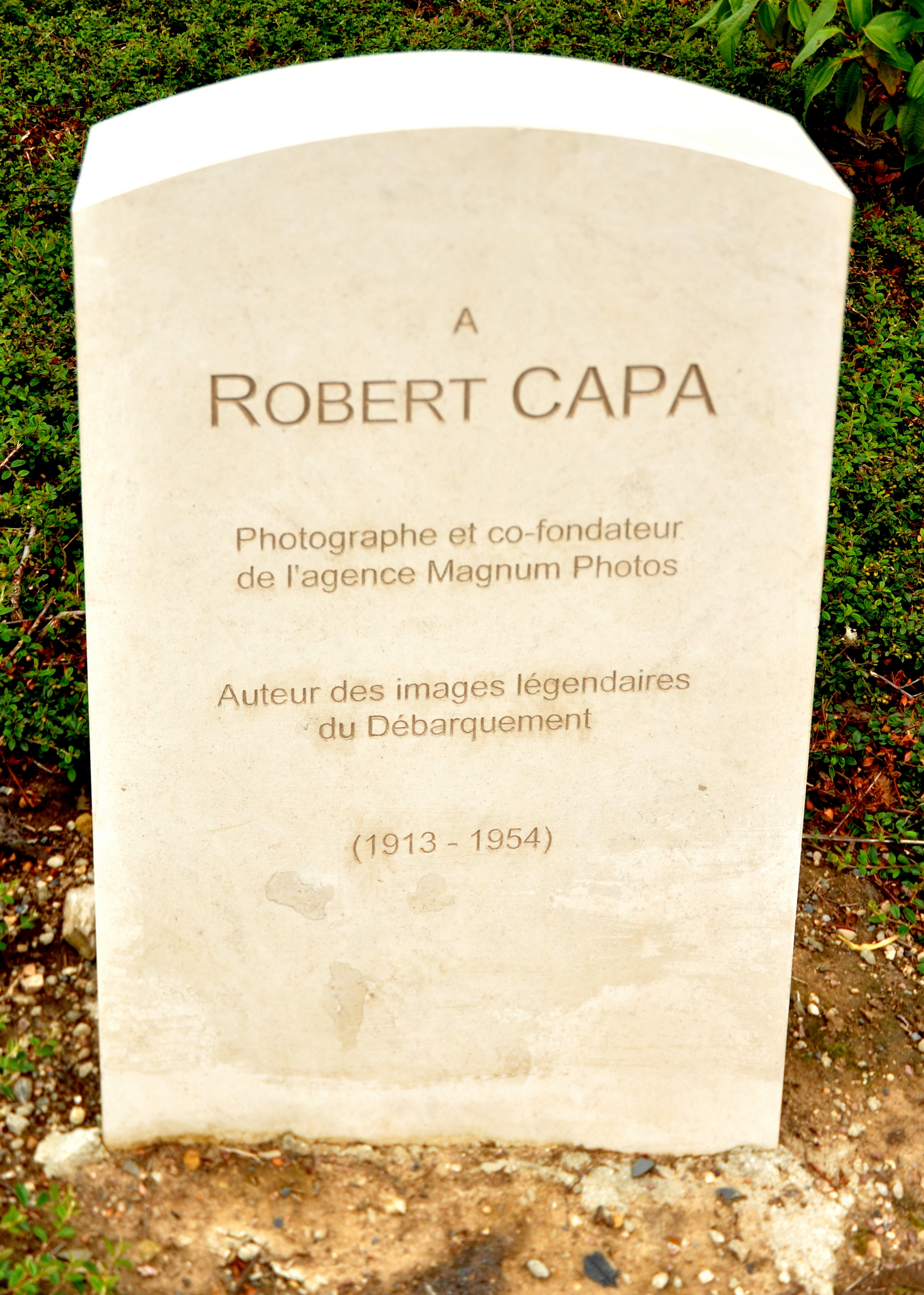
Monument to Robert Capa's death in Normandy, France

The government of Hungary issued a postage stamp in Capa's honor in 2013. That same year it issued a 5,000-forint ($20) gold coin, also in his honor, showing an engraving of Capa.

His younger brother, Cornell Capa, also a photographer, worked to preserve and promote Robert's legacy as well as develop his own identity and style. He founded the International Fund for Concerned Photography in 1966. To give this collection a permanent home, he founded the International Center of Photography in New York City in 1974. This was one of the foremost and most extensive conservation efforts on photography to be developed. Indeed, Capa and his brother believed strongly in the importance of photography and its preservation, much like film would later be perceived and duly treated in a similar way. The Overseas Press Club created the Robert Capa Gold Medal in the photographer's honor.

Capa is known for redefining wartime photojournalism. His work came from the trenches as opposed to the more arms-length perspective that was the precedent. He was famed for saying, "If your photographs aren't good enough, you're not close enough."

He is credited with coining the term Generation X. He used it as a title for a photo-essay about the young people reaching adulthood immediately after the Second World War. It was published in 1953 in Picture Post (UK) and Holiday (US). Capa said, "We named this unknown generation, The Generation X, and even in our first enthusiasm we realised that we had something far bigger than our talents and pockets could cope with."

In 1947, for his work recording World War II in pictures, U.S. general Dwight D. Eisenhower awarded Capa the Medal of Freedom Citation The International Center of Photography organized a travelling exhibition titled This Is War: Robert Capa at Work, which displayed Capa's innovations as a photojournalist in the 1930s and 1940s. It includes vintage prints, contact sheets, caption sheets, handwritten observations, personal letters and original magazine layouts from the Spanish Civil War, the Second Sino-Japanese War and World War II. The exhibition appeared at the Barbican Art Gallery, the International Center of Photography of Milan, and the Museu Nacional d'Art de Catalunya in the fall of 2009, before moving to the Nederlands Fotomuseum from October 10, 2009, until January 10, 2010.

In 1976 Capa was posthumously inducted into the International Photography Hall of Fame and Museum.

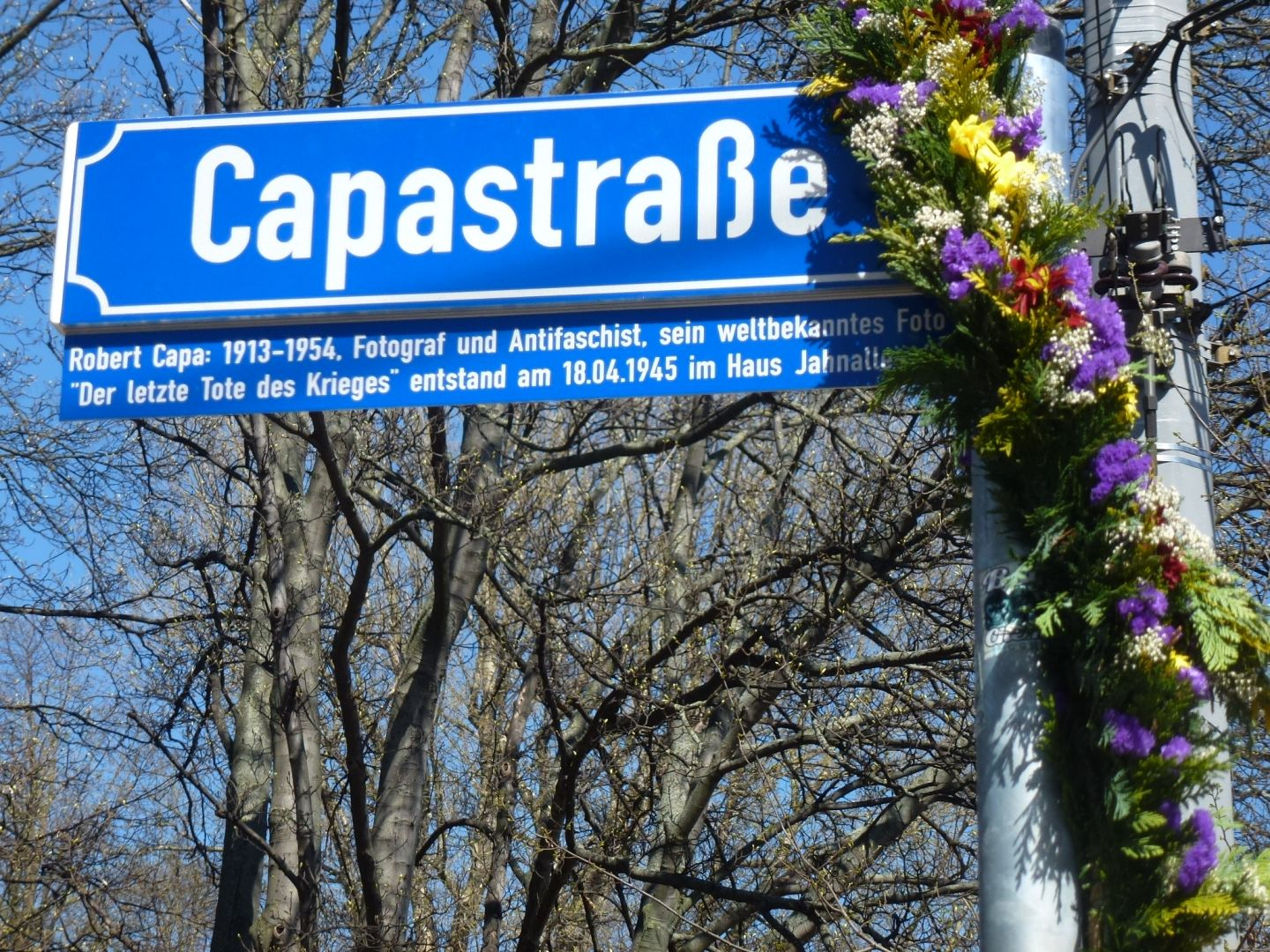
A street in Leipzig named after Capa

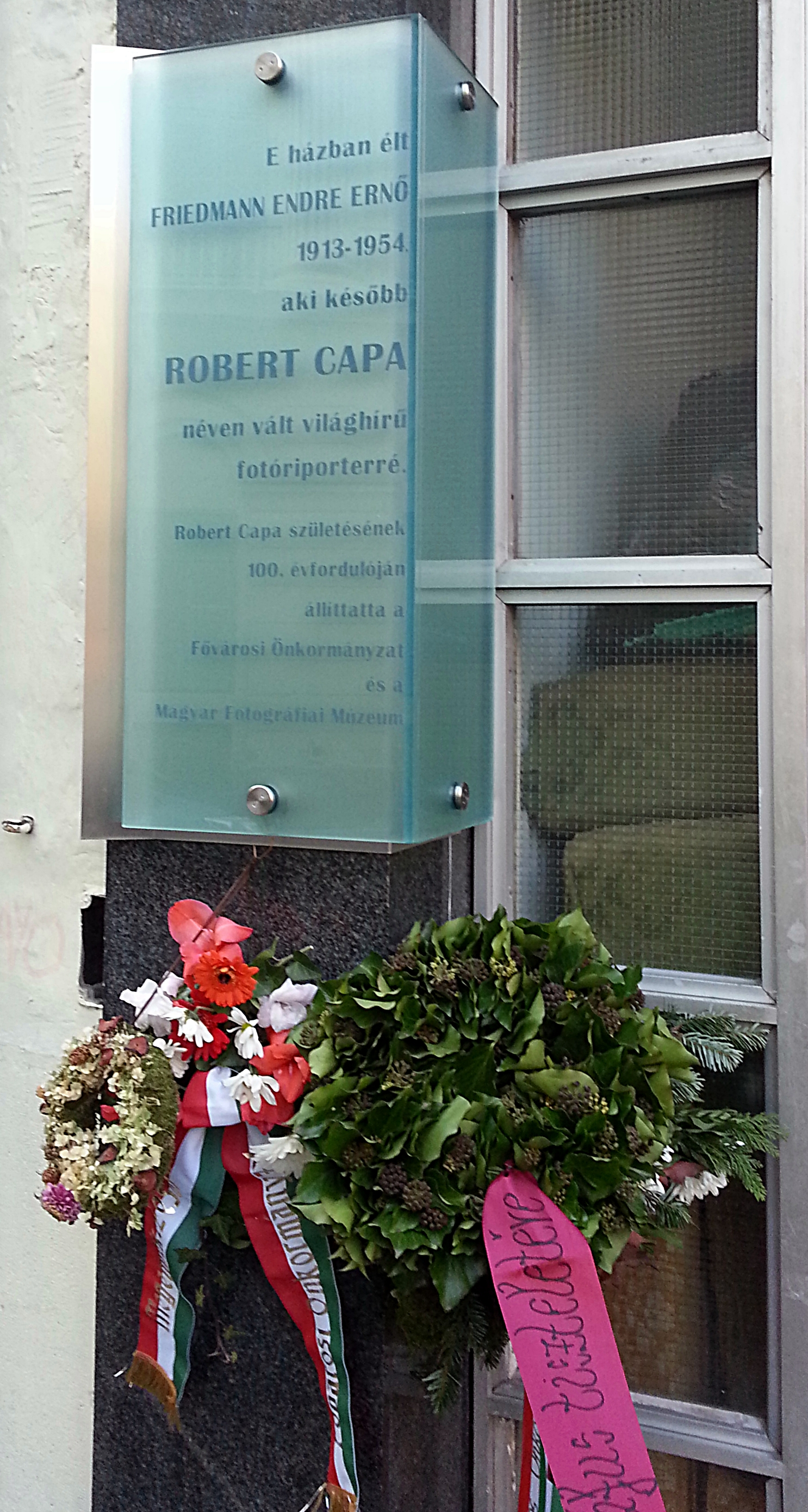
Commemorative plaque for Capa in Budapest

== Politics ==
As a young boy, Capa was drawn to the Munkakör (Employment Circle), a group of socialist and avant-garde artists, photographers, and intellectuals centered around Budapest. He participated in the demonstrations against the Miklós Horthy regime. In 1931, just before his first photo was published, Capa was arrested by the Hungarian secret police, beaten, and jailed for his radical political activity. A police official's wife—who happened to know his family—won Capa's release on the condition that he would leave Hungary immediately.

The Boston Review has described Capa as "a leftist, and a democrat—he was passionately pro-Loyalist and passionately anti-fascist ..." During the Spanish Civil War, Capa travelled with and photographed the Workers' Party of Marxist Unification (POUM), which resulted in his best-known photograph.

The British magazine Picture Post ran his photos from Spain in the 1930s accompanied by a portrait of Capa, in profile, with the simple description: "He is a passionate democrat, and he lives to take photographs."

== Artistic style ==
Robert Capa's photographic style is characterized by his commitment to capturing the raw and immediate realities of war. He famously stated, "If your pictures aren't good enough, you're not close enough," reflecting his philosophy of immersing himself in the action to convey authenticity.

== In popular culture ==
- In 2013, the Japanese Female Musical Theater group Takarazuka Revue produced a musical piece based on the life of Capa. Ms. Ouki Kaname performed the lead role as Capa. The group performed the musical in 2012 in Takarazuka and Tokyo and in 2014 in Nagoya.
- In Patrick Modiano's novella Afterimage Capa is a mentor for the subject of the novella, Francis Jansen, a photographer who retires to Mexico.
- In Alfred Hitchcock's movie Rear Window, the protagonist L. B. "Jeff" Jefferies (James Stewart) was partly based on Capa.
- Poet Owen Sheers wrote a poem about Capa, named Happy Accidents. It can be found in the anthology Skirrid Hill.
- In English indie rock group Alt-J's 2012 album An Awesome Wave, the love between Capa and Taro, and the circumstances of his death are described in the second-to-last track, "Taro".
- The Austrian rock singer Falco wrote the song "Kamikaze Cappa" in tribute to Capa.

== Collections ==
- Art Institute of Chicago, Chicago, Illinois
- Metropolitan Museum of Art, New York
- Museum of Modern Art, New York
- Robert Capa Contemporary Photography Center, Budapest
- Robert Capa: The Definitive Collection, Magnum Photos
- Robert Capa, International Center of Photography
- Robert Capa Photographs, Worcester Art Museum
- Robert Capa, The J. Paul Getty Museum
- Robert Capa, International Photography Hall of Fame

== Publications ==
=== Publications by Capa ===
- The Battle of Waterloo Road. New York: Random House, 1941. OCLC 654774055. Photographs by Capa. With text by Diana Forbes-Robertson.
- Invasion!. New York, London: D. Appleton-Century, 1944. OCLC 1022382. Photographs by Capa. With text by Charles Wertenbaker.
- Slightly Out of Focus. New York: Henry Holt and Company, 1947. New York: Modern Library, 2001. ISBN 9780375753961. Text and photographs by Capa. With a foreword by Cornell Capa and an introduction by Richard Whelan. A memoir.
- Images of War. New York: Grossman, 1964. Text and photographs by Capa. OCLC 284771. With a text by John Steinbeck.
- Robert Capa: Photographs. New York: Aperture, 1996. ISBN 978-0893816759. New York: Aperture, 2004.
- Heart of Spain: Robert Capa's Photographs of the Spanish Civil War. New York: Aperture, 1999. ISBN 9780893818319. New York: Aperture, 2005. ISBN 978-1931788021.
- Robert Capa: The Definitive Collection. London, New York: Phaidon, 2001. ISBN 9780714840673. London, New York: Phaidon, 2004. ISBN 978-0714844497. Edited by Richard Whelan.
- Robert Capa at Work: This is War!. Göttingen: Steidl, 2009. ISBN 9783865219442. Photographs by Capa. With a foreword by Willis E. Hartshorn, an introduction by Christopher Phillips, and text by Richard Whelan. Published to accompany an exhibition at the International Center of Photography, New York, September 2007 – January 2008. "A detailed examination of six of Robert Capa's most important war reportages from the first half of his career: the Falling Soldier (1936), Chinese resistance to the Japanese invasion (1938), the end of the Spanish Civil War in Catalonia (1938–39), D-Day, the US paratroop invasion of Germany and the liberation of Leipzig (1945)."
  - Questa è la Guerra!: Robert Capa al Lavoro. Italy: Contrasto, 2009. ISBN 9788869651601. Published to accompany an exhibition in Milan, March–June 2009.

=== Publications with others ===
- Death in the Making. New York: Covici Friede, 1938. Photographs by Capa and Taro.
- A Russian Journal. New York: Viking, 1948. Text by John Steinbeck, illustrated with photographs by Capa.
- Report on Israel. New York: Simon & Schuster, 1950. By Irwin Shaw and Capa.

=== Publications about Capa ===
- Robert Capa: a Biography. New York: Knopf, 1985. By Richard Whelan. ISBN 0-394-52488-8.
- Blood and Champagne: The Life and Times of Robert Capa. Macmillan, 2002; Thomas Dunne, 2003; ISBN 978-0312315641. Da Capo Press, 2004; ISBN 978-0306813566. By Alex Kershaw.
- La foto de Capa. Córdoba: Paso de Cebra Ediciones, 2011. A fictionalised account of the discovery of the exact location of the "Falling Soldier" photograph. ISBN 978-84-939103-0-3.
- Nizza oder die Liebe zur Kunst. Bad König: Vantage Point World, 2013. By Axel Dielmann. ISBN 978-3-981-53549-5. Text in German.
