= Forbes-Robertson =

Forbes-Robertson is a surname. Notable people with the surname include:

- Eric Forbes-Robertson (1865–1935), British figure and landscape painter
- Frances Forbes-Robertson (1866–1956), British novelist
- James Forbes-Robertson VC, DSO & Bar, MC (1884–1955), Scottish recipient of the Victoria Cross
- Jean Forbes-Robertson (1905–1962), English actress
- John Forbes-Robertson (actor) (1928–2008), British actor, played the title role in the Hammer horror series of Dracula films
- Johnston Forbes-Robertson (1853–1937), English actor and theatre manager
- Norman Forbes-Robertson (1858–1932), actor and prominent member of London's exclusive Garrick Club

== See also ==
- Forbes (name)
- Robertson (surname)
