= Barnsbury Square =

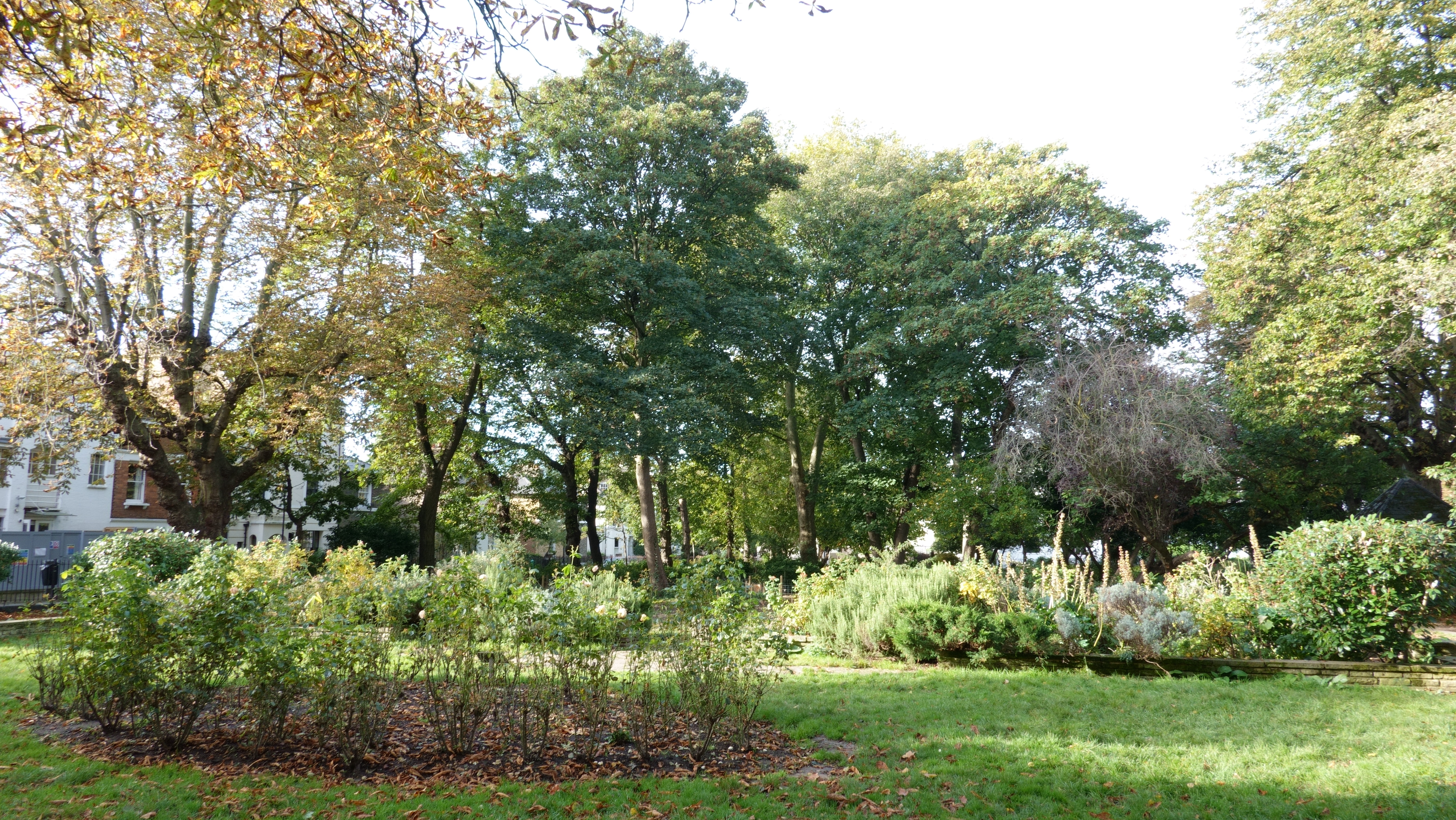
- Barnsbury Square, showing mature trees and flower beds

- Location within London Borough of Islington
- Postal code: N1
- Coordinates: 51.541852°N 0.110614°W

Construction
- Construction start: 1835
- Completion: 1848; 1889-91; 1930s; 1960-70; 2016

Barnsbury Square is a garden square in the Barnsbury district of Islington, North London. It is bounded by Victorian villas and Regency and Victorian terraces, several of which are listed buildings. The central public gardens contain flower beds and mature trees.

== History ==
=== Roman Encampment ===
In the 18th and 19th centuries, the area to the west of the current square was widely described as being the site of an ancient Roman camp used by the Roman governor of Britain, Gaius Suetonius Paulinus, before defeating queen Boudica (Boadicea) of the British Iceni tribe at Battle Bridge (now Kings Cross) in AD 61. However, this myth has no archaeological foundation, and most historians now favour potential sites in The Midlands for the decisive battle. The ancient earthworks of the Barnsbury site, which were built over in the 1930s, were probably the remains of the fosse of a medieval manor house belonging to Barnsbury Manor.

=== Development ===
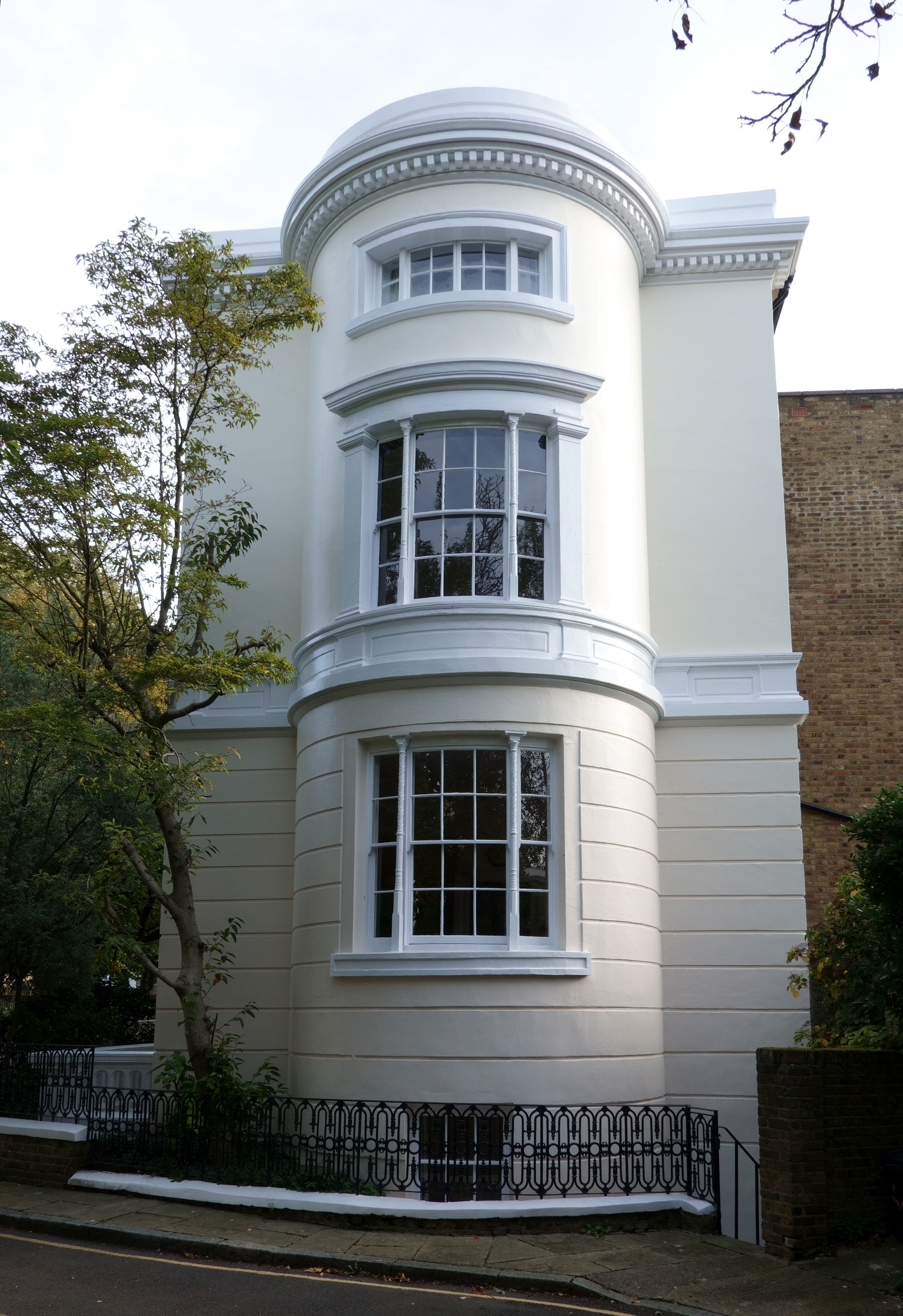
West Lodge, 13 Barnsbury Square, built about 1845, showing 3-storey bowed projection

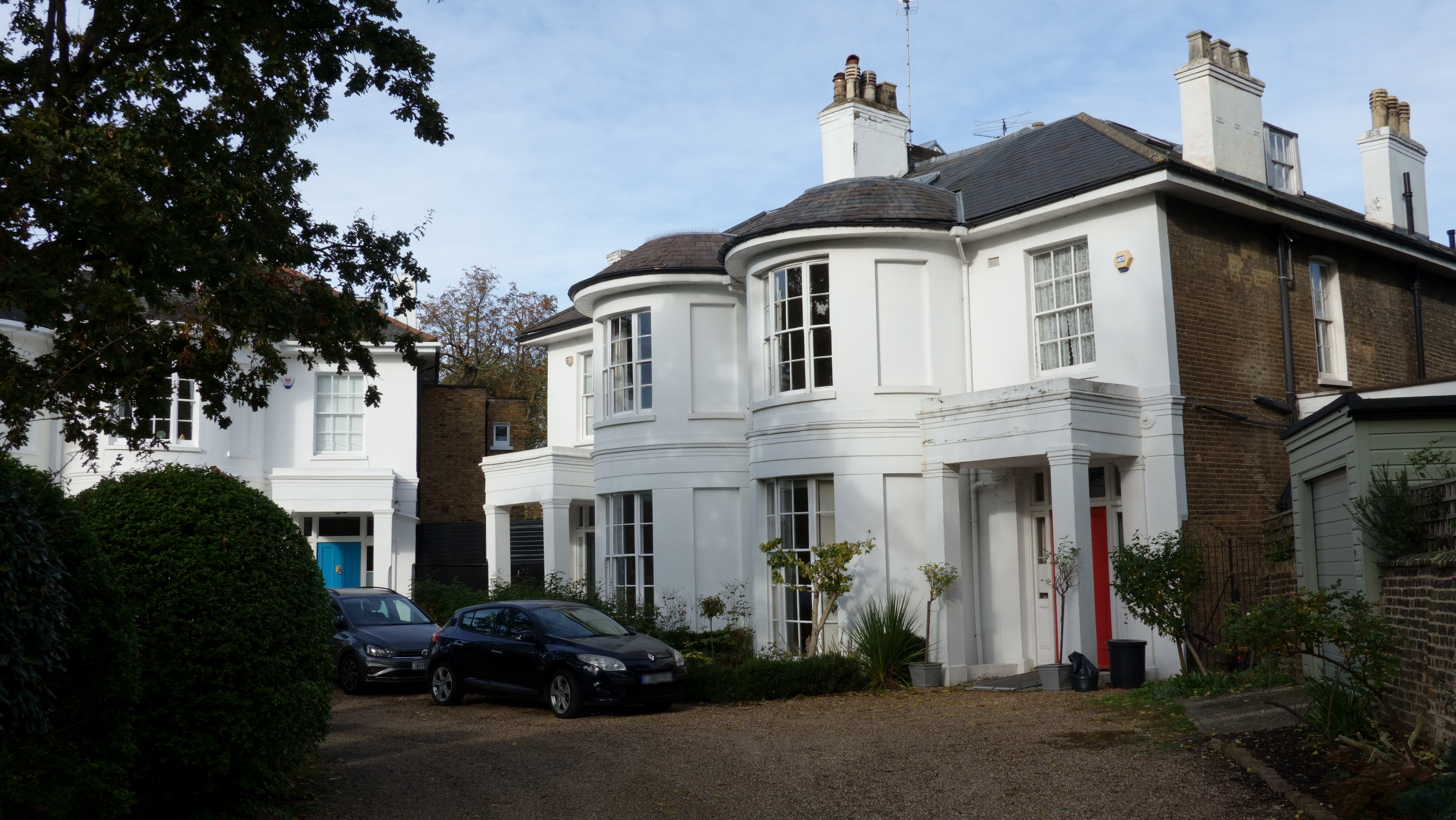
Villas in Mountfort Crescent, built about 1837 to 1845

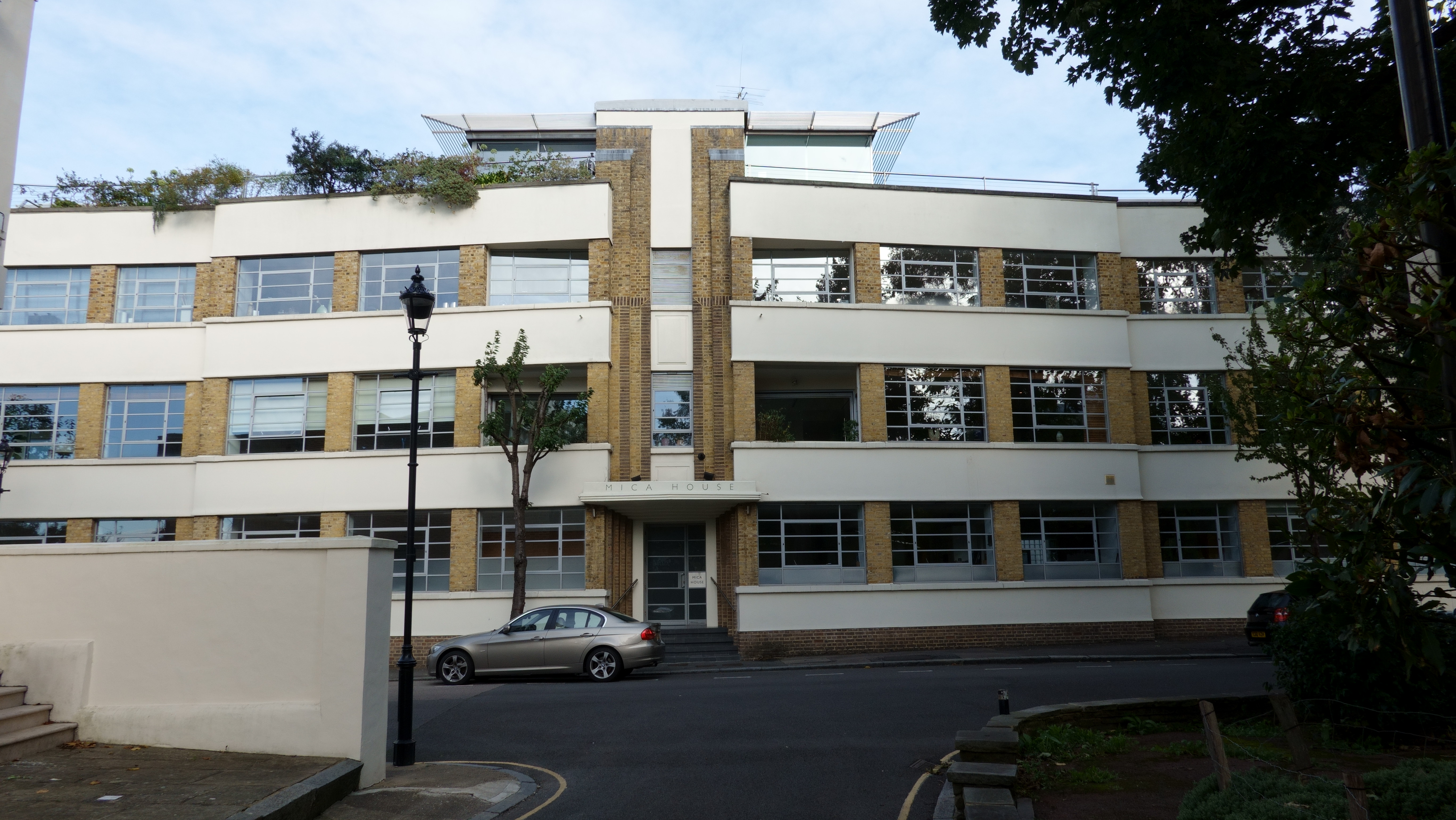
Mica House, built 1935

Barnsbury takes its name from the de Berners family, who held land in the area from soon after the Norman Conquest and which remained in the family until the early 16th century. The manorial estate was eventually broken up when the locality was developed for housing starting in the early 19th century.

Barnsbury Square is unique among Islington’s squares in not evolving as terraces, instead being a central space with disparate single and paired villas on three sides. No side is the same as another. Development of the area known then as “Pond Field” began in the 1820s, starting with Minerva Terrace (62-82 Thornhill Road) in 1827 on the east side, although this was never integrated into the square and was probably never deliberately planned to be part of one. The first reference to “Barnesbury Square” was in 1834, and the substantial small mansion named Mountfort House was built the next year on the west side, its rear garden including the old earthworks. Mountfort Crescent, containing two pairs of bow-fronted semi-detached houses and a single bow-fronted house, was begun around 1837, also on the west side. The north and south sides of the square were built probably starting in 1837, in a variety of styles, with the building partially curtailed by the long back gardens of Thornhill Road’s corner houses. This phase of building was completed by 1848.

As Barnsbury’s prosperity declined in the late 19th century, housing and light industrial development filled in many open spaces. Mountfort House was converted to industrial use, a workshop built on its north side, and its garden built over by a factory building, Mica House. In the 20th century, two villas on the north side were destroyed in the Blitz and replaced by six low-rise houses.

In recent years, Mountfort House and Mica House have been restored and converted to private dwellings, and the workshop replaced by a modern, glass, apartment and office building. Gentrification has restored the other buildings surrounding the square.

=== Barnsbury Square Gardens ===
The central gardens occupy 1 acre (0.40 ha), measuring 134 feet (41 m) on the east and west sides, 299 feet (91 m) on the north side, and 308 feet (94 m) on the south side. Until 1909 the surrounding houses had the right of the “soil” of the square, and the gardens were kept as private ornamental pleasure gardens for the residents. In 1889 the Metropolitan Public Gardens Association (MPGA) purchased the lease of the gardens and laid them out before transferring them to Islington Vestry in 1891 when they were opened to the public. The lease expired in 1909, after which there were disputes over the freehold, and attempts to purchase it for the public failed in 1911. The gardens were then levelled for use as tennis courts and otherwise abandoned, with the railings broken down and the mature trees damaged. In 1933 the freehold was belatedly acquired by Islington Council, and the MPGA funded the restoration and replanting of the gardens. According to the Islington Gazette, they now had “neat lawns and paths, a rockery running across the length of the upper lawn, a fountain, newly repaired, and teak seats.” The gardens have since been maintained by the Council. Further re-landscaping was carried out in the 1960s including a new pavilion, new railings, paths and raised beds. Recently the gardens have been maintained with assistance from volunteers of The Friends of Barnsbury Square Gardens.

== Notable residents ==
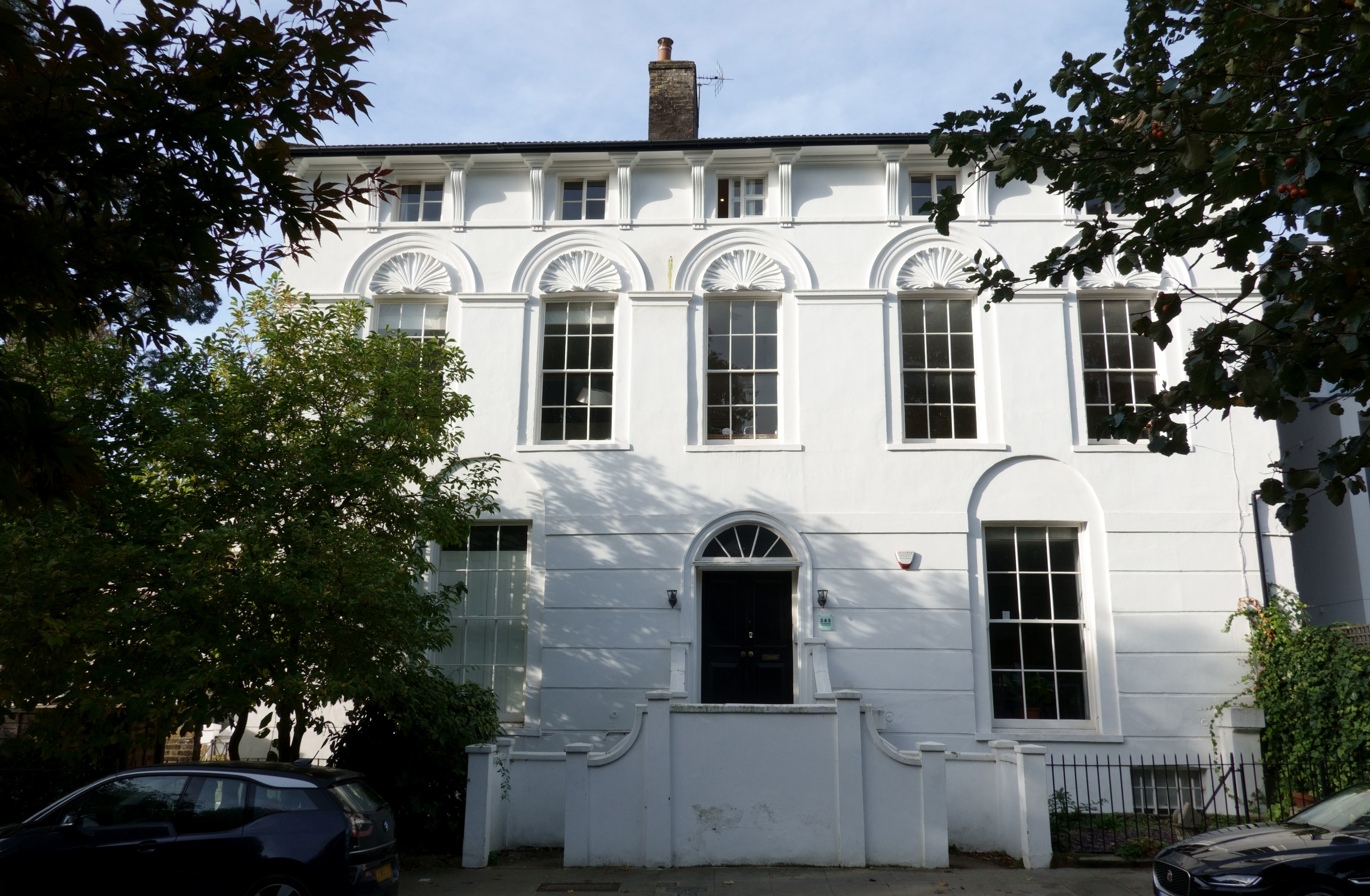
Mountfort House, built about 1835. Childhood home of actor Sir Johnston Forbes-Robertson

The best-known inhabitants of the square were the Forbes-Robertson family, including Sir Johnston Forbes-Robertson, eminent Shakespearean actor, who spent much of his childhood at Mountfort House between 1859 and 1874. His siblings also lived there, including the novelist Frances, the actors Ian and Norman, and the painter Eric Forbes-Robertson. Their father John was a successful journalist and art critic, and famous visitors to Mountfort House at this time were artists and writers, including Algernon Swinburne, Dante Gabriel Rossetti, Marie Spartali, Ford Madox Brown, William and Jane Morris, Lawrence Alma-Tadema, William Hamo Thornycroft, Arthur Hughes and George MacDonald.

Ernest Starling, physiologist, was born at no. 2.

== In film and tv ==
Location shots of Barnsbury Square filmed in June 1974 featured in an episode of the period drama Upstairs, Downstairs entitled Home Fires.
