= Beatrice Forbes-Robertson Hale =

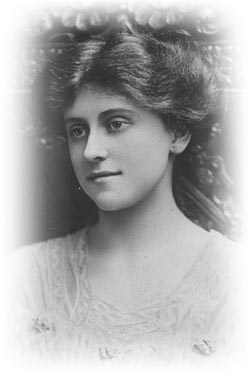
- Born: 1881
- Died: 1967 (aged 85–86)

Beatrice Forbes-Robertson Hale (1883 – 5 September 1967) was an English actress, lecturer, writer, and suffragist.

== Early life ==
Beatrice Forbes-Robertson was born in England, the daughter of Gertrude Knight and Ian Forbes-Robertson, and the granddaughter of drama critic Joseph Knight. She was the niece of actors Sir Johnston Forbes-Robertson and Norman Forbes-Robertson, and the cousin of aviation engineer Maxine (Blossom) Miles and actress Jean Forbes-Robertson.

== Career and activism ==
Forbes-Robertson was active as an actress from age 17, and a suffrage speaker in England before she moved to New York City in 1907 to continue her theatrical and political work. She joined the New Theatre Company, and played leading and ingenue roles in plays including The Morals of Marcus, The Mollusc, The Cottage in the Air, and Strife by John Galsworthy. She was a member of Heterodoxy, a feminist debating club based in Greenwich Village, and vice president of the Actresses' Franchise League. During World War I she was president of the British War Relief Association, raising funds in New York for military hospitals abroad.

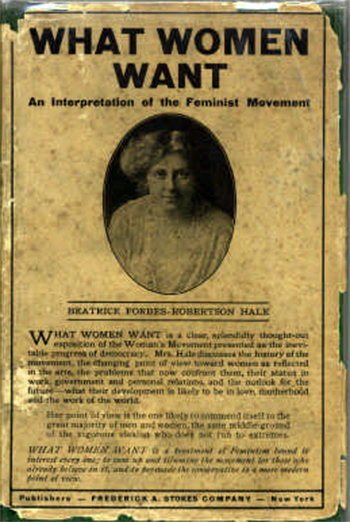
"What Women Want"

Mrs. Hale left the stage after marriage and motherhood, but continued as a lecturer on women's rights, dress reform and fashion, and theatre topics, into her later years. On January 18, 1916, she spoke before the General Assembly of Kentucky on women's right to vote. In 1919 she spoke at a large rally in support of the Girl Scouting movement at the DAR Constitution Hall in Washington D. C.

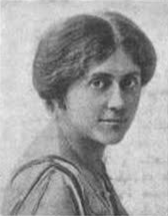
Beatrice Forbes-Robertson Hale, 1921

Mrs. Hale also wrote several books, including What Women Want: An Interpretation of the Feminist Movement (1914), The Nest Builder (1916, a novel), Little Allies: A Story of Four Children (1918), and What's Wrong with Our Girls? (1923). In What Women Want, Hale surveyed the state of the American feminist movement in the 1910s, declaring:

Women have often been taunted with lack of the creative and reasoning faculties. But until the present age the number of women possessing opportunities to develop these has been so small in proportion to men as to make any comparison invidious. Only now are the faculties of women emerging from obscurity....When as many women as men are free to express themselves, there will remain but one struggle on earth, the struggle of all the dispossessed, men and women alike, for their inheritance.

== Personal life and legacy ==
Beatrice Forbes-Robertson married lawyer Swinburne Hale in 1910. They were the parents of three daughters, Sanchia (b. 1911), and twins Rosemary and Clemency (b. 1913). The Hales divorced in 1920. About 140 of her letters from the period 1913-1919 are in the Swinburne Hale Papers at the New York Public Library.
