= Frederick George Miles =

British aircraft designer and manufacturer (1903–1976)

- F.G. Miles
- Born: 22 March 1903; Worthing, Sussex, England
- Died: 15 August 1976 (aged 73); Worthing, Sussex, England
- Other names: "Miles"
- Occupations: Aircraft engineer, company director
- Known for: Aircraft designs
- Spouse: Maxine (Blossom) Thomas married 1932
- Parent(s): Esther Miles & Frederick Gaston Miles
- Relatives: George Herbert Miles (Brother / Aircraft Designer), Reginald Howard Miles (Brother); Dennis William Miles (Brother) Jeremy Miles (Son)

Frederick George Miles (22 March 1903 – 15 August 1976) was a British aircraft designer and manufacturer who designed numerous light civil and military aircraft and a range of prototypes. The name "Miles" is associated with two distinct companies that Miles was involved in and is also attached to many non-aviation products such as the Biro pen, photocopiers and book binding machinery. Throughout his life, he was known as "Miles" and never by his first name, even to his own family.

== Early life ==
Miles was born on 22 March 1903 in Worthing Sussex, the oldest of four sons of Frederick Gaston Miles, a laundry proprietor (Star Model Laundry, Portslade), and his wife Esther. Miles's father is noted in the 1901 census as being a 25-year-old laundry warehouseman but by the time of the next census in 1911, he is described as being the proprietor of the laundry, a business which continued into the 1970s. Miles's father was an astute businessman who was able to support Miles's early interest in aviation.

Miles left school early in 1916 and started a motorcycle rental business. He soon became interested in aircraft and in 1922, at the back of his father's laundry, with some friends and his brother George, Miles designed, then built a small biplane called the Gnat. The aircraft was not flown.

Local pilot Cecil Pashley, who was persuaded to become a partner in a budding aviation business, taught Miles to fly in Pashley's Avro 504K at Shoreham Airport. The Pashley and Miles partnership led to a flying school and joyriding business known as the Gnat Aeroplane Co. In May 1927, the company was formally incorporated as the Gnat Aero Company, Ltd. with a share capital of £1,500. The first directors were F.G. Miles, C.L. Pashley and F. Gaston Miles. The company soon expanded into aircraft repairs and then split into two separate operations: the Southern Aero Club and Southern Aircraft. One of the aircraft Miles acquired was an Avro Baby, which he modified to turn it into an aerobatic sports aircraft he called the Southern Martlet. Miles was later joined as a director in both companies by Magnus Herman Volk, the eldest son of engineer Magnus Volk, who from an early age, had a keen interest in aviation.

== Personal life ==
In 1930, Miles intended to emigrate to South Africa to remove himself from a difficult situation caused by his falling in love with one of his pupils, Maxine Freeman-Thomas. Blossom, as Maxine was known, was daughter of the actors Gertrude Elliot and Sir Johnston Forbes-Robertson.

"In June 1930, The Hon Inigo Freeman-Thomas (Viscount Ratendone from February 1931), and his wife Maxine, came to Shoreham to learn to fly. Eventually Miles was to have an affair with Maxine; to remove himself from the difficult situation, in August 1931 he emigrated to South Africa. However, his time in South Africa was short; about to be prosecuted for dangerous flying (he had flown over the local flying club with the aircraft’s wheels running along the corrugated iron roof!), he hastily returned to England, arriving in Southampton on 24 September 1931 aboard the SS Windsor Castle."

"Her husband, the Viscount, was the money behind the fledgling flying school owned by Fred and his partners. In emotional turmoil, Fred sold out his portion of the business, bought a trainer plane and shipped it to Cape Town, South Africa, to start a new life."

Miles was cited as a co-defendant with Blossom an undefended divorce suit in 1931, which resulted in her husband being granted a decree nisi, leading to a divorce. Miles returned from South Africa after a year and then married Blossom who became known as Blossom Miles. She was a pilot, a designer, draughtswoman, aerodynamicist and stress engineer and a director of a manufacturing company. She oversaw the development of the Miles Technical School. The couple had two children, Jeremy (born 1933) and Mary Susannah (born 1939).

Miles and Blossom owned Cudlow House, Cudlow Garden, Rustington, Littlehampton, West Sussex; this was the house where the Llewelyn Davies family spent holidays, and inspired J. M. Barrie to write the Peter Pan story.

== 1930s – Phillips and Powis ==
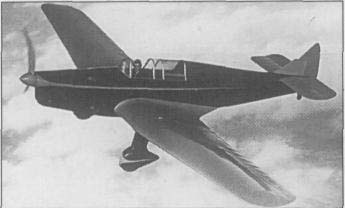
Charles Lindbergh's Miles Mohawk

Together F.G. and Blossom designed a single-seat biplane in 1932 (the Miles M1 Satyr), which was built for them by George Parnall & Co of Yate, Gloucestershire.

In 1932 Miles met Charles Powis a motor engineer and owner of an aircraft business Phillips & Powis based at Woodley Aerodrome, Woodley near Reading. Miles agreed to design a cheap, but modern light monoplane which he called the Miles Hawk, built by Phillips and Powis at Woodley. The Hawk sold well and Miles joined the company as technical director and chief designer. His brother, George followed him as a test pilot and manager of the engine section. Other successful designs followed, including one "special" commissioned from Miles by Charles Lindbergh and known as the Miles Mohawk.

In 1935 Phillips and Powis became a public company with Rolls-Royce Limited becoming a major shareholder. Miles became chairman and managing director and his brother George, became technical director and chief designer. With the expansion of the Royal Air Force, the company in 1937 won a contract worth £2 million for the Miles Magister basic trainer. This was followed by a similar order for 900 Master I aircraft in 1938, followed by later large orders for 2,402 Master II and III aircraft and 1,789 Martinet and Queen Martinet aircraft were made for the RAF with a small number to the Royal Navy and overseas.

=== Aero Engine ===
C. F. Caunter designed a 60 hp two-stroke light aero engine. Miles built a test prototype of the Caunter engine and successful tests were carried out at the Woodley Aerodrome during the late 1930s. However, with the onset of the Second World War, the Powis & Phillips works turned their full attention to aircraft production and Caunter eventually sold his design to the Alvis company.

== Miles Aircraft Limited ==
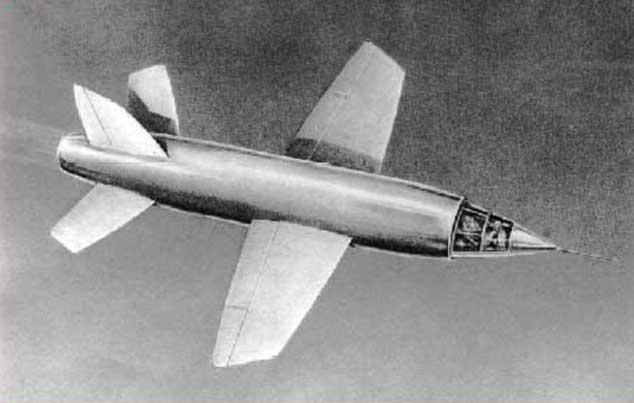
Miles M52

Rolls-Royce lost interest in the company and in 1941, Miles bought financial control of the company which he renamed Miles Aircraft Limited in 1943. Miles and Blossom also started the Miles Aeronautical School to train apprentice technicians and draughtsman. The apprentices developed a test bed airframe known as the Miles Venture.

In 1943, Miles was shown a prototype ballpoint pen made by László Bíró and offered to produce them for the Royal Air Force. The ministry were concerned that it would distract from aircraft production but Miles eventually persuaded government officials to let him use 17 unskilled women to produce the Biro pen, which was the world's first commercially successful ballpoint pen. At the end of the war, the Reading biro factory which would employ 700 people, became the Miles Martin Pen Company and the Biro was sold to the general public.

With his brother George, now Chief Designer for the aircraft, Miles concentrated on a design for a supersonic aircraft (the M.52) powered by the then secret Whittle jet engine. The government contract and the programme was cancelled in 1946. Data from this project was shared with the National Advisory Committee for Aeronautics (NACA – later to become NASA), also at work on supersonic aircraft designs during this period.

Problems with the return to civil production led to the collapse of Miles Aircraft in 1948. On 21 March 1950, following an investigation by the Board of Trade, Miles and Sir William Malcolm Mount, Bt. (former financial executive of the company) were formally committed for trial at Marylebone Magistrates' Court, the Old Bailey on summonses under the Prevention of Fraud (Investment) Act 1939. Bail of £500 was set in each case. The charges arose from alleged concealment of facts and misleading statements made in a share prospectus concerning the manufacture of Aerovan, Merchantman and other aircraft. Both men were later acquitted.

== F.G. Miles Limited ==
Undeterred, in 1949, Miles started a new company "F.G. Miles Ltd" at Redhill, and in 1952 moved back to Shoreham. In 1961, the aviation interests of the company became part of the new Beagle Group and Miles became the deputy chairman and his brother, chief designer. The Beagle group collapsed in 1969.

The F. G. Miles group continued with subsidiary engineering companies involved with flight simulators, aircraft structures and other aviation projects. In 1975, Hunting Associated Industries acquired a controlling interest in F. G. Miles and all its subsidiaries. The company was renamed Hunting Hivolt and Jeremy Miles, the son of F. G. Miles (who founded the firm), became a non-executive director on the board.

Miles died on 15 August 1976 in Worthing, Sussex.
