= Van Gyseghem =

Van Gyseghem is a surname. Notable people with the surname include:

- André van Gyseghem (1906–1979), English actor and theatre director
- Joanna Van Gyseghem (born 1941), English actress
- Esther Van Gyseghem (1900–1975), founder of Patisserie Valerie
