= Hamlet (1913 film) =

1913 film by Hay Plumb

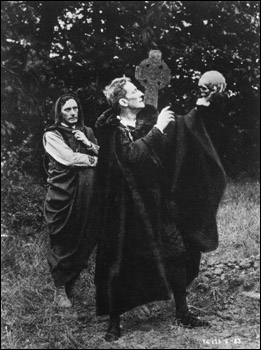
- Johnston Forbes-Robertson as Hamlet, and S. A. Cookson as Horatio in Hamlet (1913)
- Directed by: Hay Plumb
- Based on: Hamlet; 1599 play by William Shakespeare
- Produced by: Cecil Hepworth
- Cinematography: Geoffrey Faithfull
- Production company: Hepworth Company
- Release date: 22 September 1913 (UK)
- Running time: 64 minutes
- Country: United Kingdom

Hamlet is a 1913 British silent drama film directed by Hay Plumb and starring Johnston Forbes-Robertson, Gertrude Elliott and Walter Ringham. It is an adaptation of the play Hamlet by William Shakespeare made by the Hepworth Company and based on the Drury Lane Theatre's 1913 staging of the work.

== Plot ==
After the Ghost of his father appears, Hamlet (Forbes) kills his stepfather, but dies after sustaining fatal battle wounds.

== Cast ==
- Johnston Forbes-Robertson - Prince Hamlet
- Gertrude Elliott - Ophelia
- Walter Ringham - Claudius
- Adeleine Bourne - Gertrude
- J.H. Barnes - Polonius
- S.A. Cookson - Horatio
- Alex Scott-Gatty - Laertes
- Grendon Bentley - Fortinbras
- Montagu Rutherford - Priest
- J.H. Ryley - A Gravedigger
- Percy Rhodes - The Ghost
- Robert Atkins - Marcellus
- Eric Adeney - Reynaldo
- Richard Andean - Second Player
- George Hayes - Osric
- S.T. Pearce - Second Gravedigger
- Olive Richardson - Player Queen
- E.A. Ross - Guildenstern

== See also ==
- List of ghost films
