= The Eternal Magdalene =

1919 film

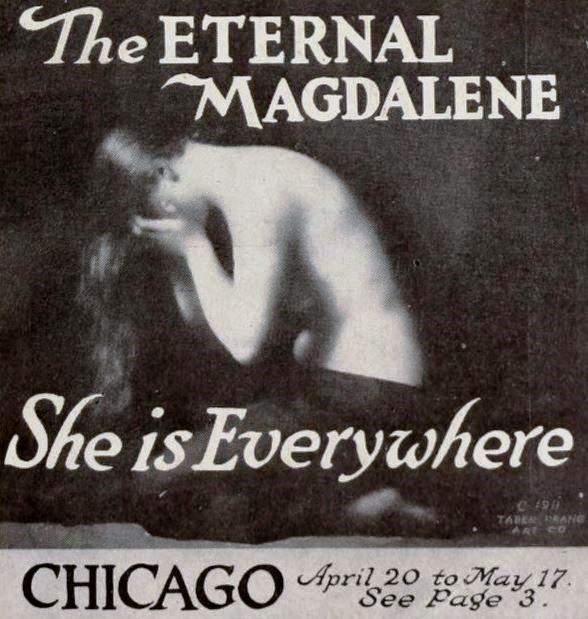

The Eternal Magdalene is a 1919 American film adapted from a play by Robert H. McLaughlin. The film was produced by Goldwyn Pictures.

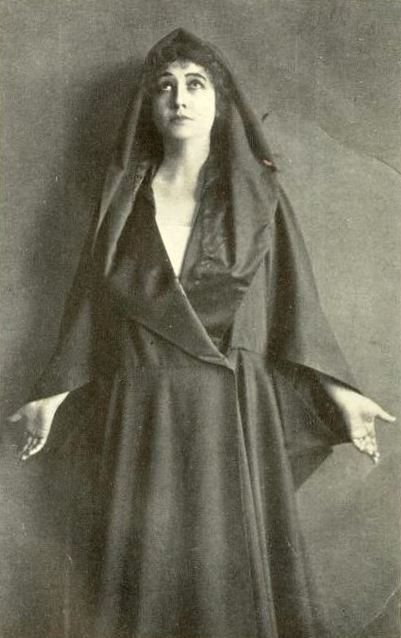
Julia Arthur in play

Julia Arthur portrayed the title character in the play in 1915. It was published by Clark Copp. One critic described McLaughlin as among problem playwriters and stated he believed the "harlot's place is in the home."

== Cast ==
- Maxine Elliott as Magdalene
- Marguerite Marsh as Elizabeth Bradshaw
- Charles Dalton
- Charles Trowbridge
- Donald Gallaher
- Maud Cooling
- Vernon Steele as Preacher

== Gallery ==
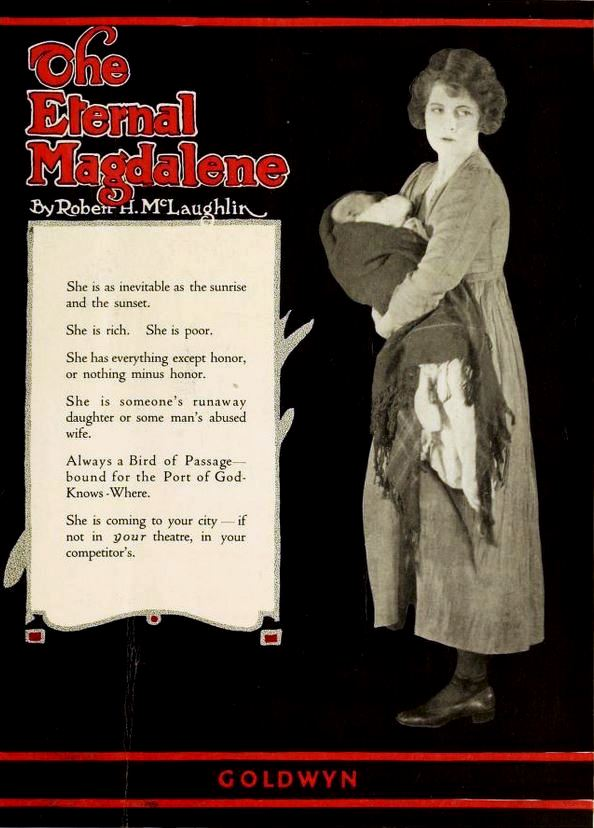
