= Frances Forbes-Robertson =

British artist, novelist, and actor

Frances Harrod
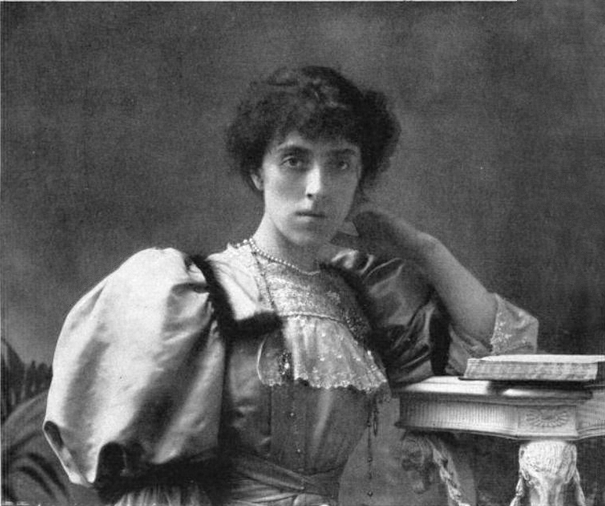
- Born: Frances Mary Desirée Forbes-Robertson; 1866; UK
- Died: 23 May 1956 (aged 89–90); London, England
- Occupations: artist, novelist, actor
- Spouse: Henry Dawes Harrod (m. 1900; died 1919)
- Children: Roy Harrod
- Relatives: Johnston Forbes-Robertson (brother); Norman Forbes-Robertson (brother); Eric Forbes-Robertson (brother); Meriel Forbes (great-niece)

Frances Forbes-Robertson (after marriage, Frances Harrod; 1866 – 23 May 1956) was a British artist, novelist, and actor. Among her publications can be counted The Devil's Pronoun (1894), Odd Stories (1897), The Potentate (1898), Mother Earth (1902), The Hidden Model (1902), What We Dream (1903), Trespass (1928), and Stained Wings (1930).

== Biography ==
Frances Mary Desirée Forbes-Robertson was born in 1866. She was the youngest child of John Forbes-Robertson, a theatre critic and journalist from Aberdeen, and his wife Frances. The eldest of the eleven children in the family was Johnston Forbes-Robertson, the actor. Two other brothers, Ian Forbes-Robertson (1859–1936), and Norman Forbes-Robertson (1858–1932) also became actors, and a third, Eric Forbes-Robertson (1865–1935) became a painter. She was the sister-in-law of the actress Maxine Elliott, and the great-aunt of actress Meriel Forbes (granddaughter of her brother Norman), who married actor Ralph Richardson. Forbes-Robertson was educated in convents in France and Italy.

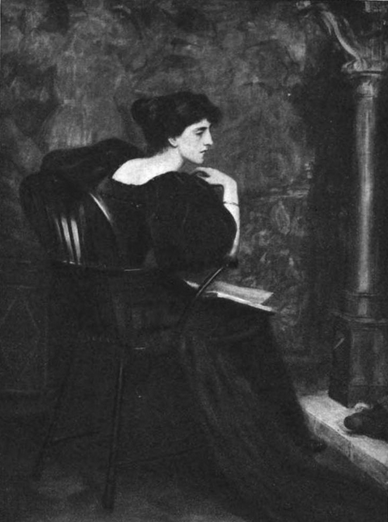
Frances Harrod. After a painting by H. de T. Glazebrook.

She married Henry Dawes Harrod FSA in 1900, and was the mother of Roy Harrod, the economist.

Forbes-Robertson (known also by her married surname, Harrod) was the author of The Potentate, Mother Earth, The Hidden Model, Odd Stories, The Devil's Pronoun, What We Dream, Taming of the Ponte, Trespass and Stained Wings. She also published other works of fiction, such as those contributed to the Times Literary Supplement, Westminster Gazette, and The Pall Mall Magazine.

She died in London, 23 May 1956.

== Selected works ==
=== As Frances Forbes-Robertson ===
- The Devil's Pronoun, 1894
- Odd Stories, 1897
- The Potentate, 1898
- " The Wanton "
- " The Horrible Man"

=== As Frances Harrod ===
- Mother Earth, 1902
- The Hidden Model, 1902
- What We Dream, 1903
- Trespass, 1928
- Stained Wings, 1930
