= C. F. Caunter =

British aviation historian and author (1899–1988)

Cyril Francis Caunter (22 March 1899 in Ilford, Essex – 10 April 1988), was a British aviation historian and author.

== Life ==
He was the son of Lionel George Caunter from Dittisham, Devon and Elizabeth Gertrude Einhauser from St Pancras, Middlesex. He attended Douai School, where Fr. Ignatius Rice M.A., O.S.B. was headmaster He was a pilot in World War I.

In 1932, Caunter published a design for a 60 hp two-stroke light aero engine. Frederick George Miles of the Phillips & Powis Aircraft company (later Miles Aircraft Ltd) built a test prototype of the Caunter engine and successful tests were carried out at Reading Aerodrome in Woodley, Berkshire, during the late 1930s. The Caunter engine performed well at Woodley with Miles, who proposed a company to produce it, to install in an aeroplane that would be sold in large numbers like Ford cars.

Caunter worked at the Royal Aircraft Establishment starting in the summer of 1937 in the aero engine department, writing some of the operational text books of the RAF aero engines, including the Rolls-Royce Merlin engine which powered the Hawker Hurricane and Supermarine Spitfire fighters.

Phillips & Powis increasingly concentrated on military training aircraft production at Woodley from the late thirties and the Caunter engine was put aside. Caunter eventually became Chief Technical Librarian for the R.A.E. after a 1943 transfer and sold his prototype engine to Alvis Ltd., Coventry, for £2,000 after the war.

In 1950, he joined the Science Museum as keeper of the Road Transport Collections, beginning ten years of work documenting one of the finest collections in existence at the time. He began the process of restoring the collection. In 1957 he drove the Museum's 1888 Benz three-wheeled car, one of the oldest cars in the world, in the London to Brighton Veteran Car Run. Its poor braking in the wet led it to run away down a hill and crash. He fitted a second brake to it in 1958 and successfully completed the Run.

The National Film Board of Canada produced Full Circle, a vignette about Caunter returning to flight and college at the age of eighty. He was writer-in-residence at Glendon College in 1979, and he received his M.A. there in June 1982.

== Works ==
Caunter's first publication was a small handbook, Model Petrol Engines, published in 1920 by Percival Marshall Ltd., followed by Small Electric Lighting Sets, which he described as "bad, although it was published". Madness Opens The Door (1932) was written in 1931 in six weeks for £100. Pitman published Small Two-Stroke Aero Engines and Small Four-Stroke Aero Engines as well as Light Aero Engines and The Two-Cycle Engine (1932). He published the novel Madness Opens The Door, a space novel, and Ex-Gangster and Killers Must Die.

Caunter wrote six HMSO books about Science Museum subjects during the 1950s. His official handbooks include The History and Development of Cycles.

In 1936 Caunter wrote Death of the War God, which was about a world war, which he scheduled in the novel to start in 1939. His publishers at that time were afraid of publishing it because of widespread anxiety of another conflict. Caunter mentions in his 1969 unpublished autobiography that his space novels were inspired by those of H. G. Wells but were written too soon to be popular in the 1970s.

== Family ==
Caunter married Kathleen Eve Murray on 12 April 1928.
