= Joanna Van Gyseghem =

British actress

- Born: Joanna Van Gyseghem; 4 September 1941 (age 85); Tunbridge Wells, Kent, England
- Occupation: Actress
- Years active: c. 1969–present
- Spouses: Ralph Bates (m. 1964; div. 1973) Terence Hillyer (m. 1973–1991)
- Children: 1 daughter

Joanna Van Gyseghem (born 4 September 1941) is a British actress.

She was educated at Malvern Girls' College in Worcestershire and Trinity College Dublin where she studied for a BA degree in French and Italian, but was heavily involved in drama productions at the time. Her father, André van Gyseghem was an English actor and director of Belgian descent, and her mother, Jean Forbes-Robertson an actress. Her maternal grandparents were the actors Gertrude Elliott and Sir Johnston Forbes-Robertson and her great-aunt was American actress Maxine Elliott.

== Career ==
Van Gyseghem appeared in the TV series Fraud Squad as Detective Sergeant Victoria "Vicky" Hicks in 1969–70, which was one of the earliest British television dramas to feature a female detective in a leading role. In 1972, she played Olivia in Twelfth Night; Punch commented on her performance "veering from intimations of imperiousness to anticipations of lechery with great charm and fine technical control". In 1977, she appeared in two episodes of the drama series Secret Army in which she played Dorothy Neville. The episodes; "Lost Sheep" and "Guilt" were both written by N.J. Crisp.

She also played Linda Cochran in the television sitcom Duty Free and Marigold Featherstone, wife of Guthrie Featherstone, QC, MP, in Rumpole of the Bailey. She also co-starred with Liza Goddard in London Weekend Television's television comedy Pig in the Middle as Susan Wade, the controlling wife of the principal character Barty Wade played by Dinsdale Landen.

Van Gyseghem had a guest role in the British sitcom Barbara. She played the role of Yvonne, an ex-girlfriend of Barbara's (Gwen Taylor) husband Ted, who visits from Miami to attend the wedding in the episode "Wedding". Yvonne takes a romantic interest in Ted; Van Gyseghem thus played Taylor's love rival, as she had done in Duty Free.

She appeared in the series The Darling Buds of May as Felicity Harran in 1993, in the TV series Heartbeat as Penelope Ealham in 2000, and played the role of Camilla Greenwood in the BBC soap opera EastEnders in 2008.

== Personal life ==
In 1964 Van Gyseghem married actor Ralph Bates whom she met at university and starred alongside in many dramatic productions. The couple divorced in 1973 and Van Gyseghem married Terence Hillyer later the same year.
