= Cecil Pashley =

British aviation pioneer (1891–1969)

Cecil Lawrence Pashley
- Born: 14 May 1891; Great Yarmouth, Norfolk, England
- Died: 10 December 1969 (aged 78); Shoreham-by-Sea, Sussex, England
- Known for: Aviation pioneer

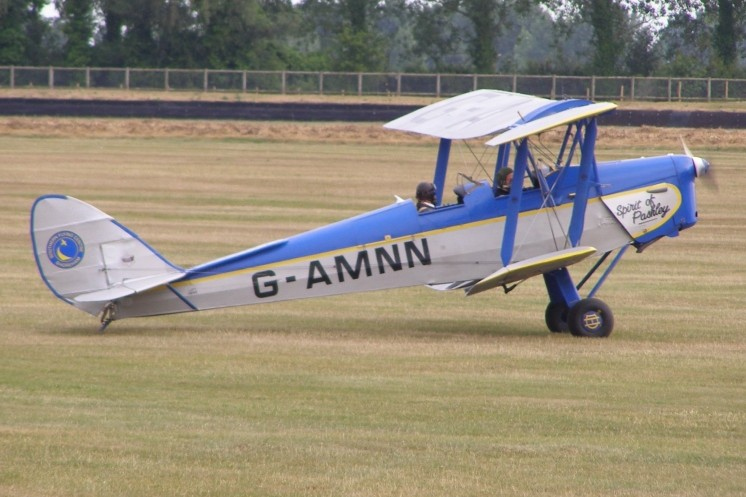
DH Tiger Moth named Spirit of Pashley

Cecil Lawrence Pashley MBE AFC (14 May 1891 – 10 December 1969) was a British aviation pioneer.

== Early life ==
Cecil Lawrence Pashley was born in Great Yarmouth, Norfolk on 14 May 1891 to Cecilia (née Ryan) and Alexander Pashley. Cecil's two brothers were both killed during the First World War; Herbert was a 2nd lieutenant observation balloon officer and died on Christmas Day in 1916, whilst Eric was a lieutenant flying Airco DH.2s with 24 Squadron Royal Flying Corps and died in an accident on 17 March 1917.

== Flying career ==
Pashley learned to fly in 1908 and, in partnership with his younger brother Eric, established a flight training school at Shoreham Airport in 1913 when they founded the South Coast Flying club. One of Pashley's students was F. G. Miles with whom he later founded the Southern Aero Club, where Miles met his wife and business partner Blossom Miles.

Pashley trained large numbers of pilots during both world wars. During the Second World War Pashley was commissioned in the Royal Air Force Volunteer Reserve. He was awarded the Air Force Cross in 1944 and made a Member of the Order of the British Empire in 1948. Pashley was a Flight Lieutenant when he resigned his commission in 1954.

In 1962 "Pash" (as he was popularly known) was presented with a special silver medal to mark his 50 years of active flying, which spanned the early days of aviation to the jet age, over which he had logged an astonishing 18,900 hours (13,000 of them on instruction) and had taught about 1600 people to fly.

== Death and legacy ==
Cecil Lawrence Pashley died on 10 December 1969, aged 78, at Southlands Hospital, Shoreham. Southern Aero Club which remained in business after his death.

A proportion of his personal archive has been purchased by the West Sussex Record Office.

A road at Shoreham Airport and a Brighton & Hove bus have been named after him.

== See also ==
- List of aviation pioneers
