= Miles Satyr =

M.1 Satyr
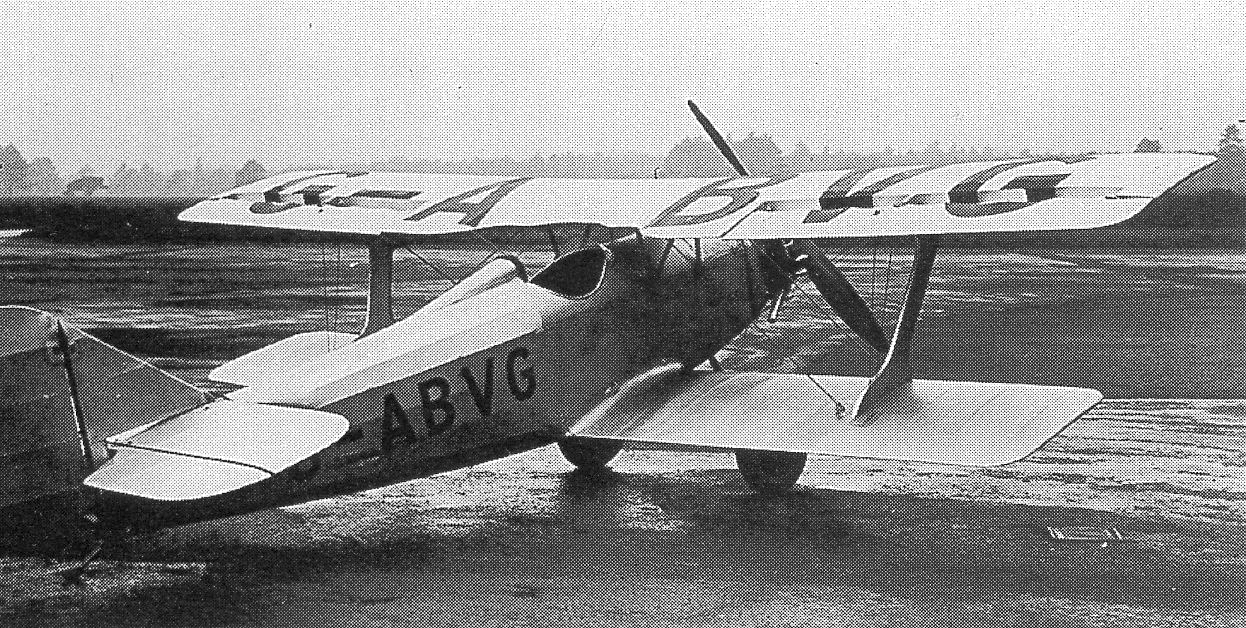

General information
- Type: Single-seat aerobatic biplane
- Manufacturer: George Parnall and Company
- Designer: Frederick George Miles
- Status: Destroyed September 1936
- Primary user: Luxury Air Tours Limited
- Number built: 1

History
- First flight: August 1932

The Miles M.1 Satyr was a 1930s British single-seat aerobatic biplane designed by F.G. Miles and built for him by George Parnall and Company.

== Design and development ==
The Satyr was designed in 1932 by F.G. Miles. It was a wooden single-seat aerobatic biplane powered by a 75 hp Pobjoy R engine. The aircraft (registered G-ABVG) first flew in August 1932. Although the aircraft flew well Miles decided to concentrate on monoplane designs and only one was built. The only Satyr crashed in September 1936.

== Specifications (M.1) ==
Data from Miles Aircraft Since 1925

General characteristics

- Crew: One
- Length: 17 ft 8 in (5.38 m)
- Wingspan: 21 ft 0 in (6.40 m)
- Wing area: 117 sq ft (10.9 m^{2})
- Empty weight: 594 lb (269 kg)
- Gross weight: 900 lb (408 kg)
- Powerplant: 1 × Pobjoy R , 75 hp (56 kW)

Performance

- Maximum speed: 125 mph (201 km/h, 109 kn)
- Cruise speed: 110 mph (180 km/h, 96 kn)
- Rate of climb: 1,400 ft/min (7.1 m/s)

== See also ==
There is film of the Satyr displaying at the British Hospitals Air Pageant at Cramlington Aerodrome, Northumberland on 12 August 1933. The sequence starts at 9:07.
