= Diana Forbes-Robertson =

British writer (1914–1987)

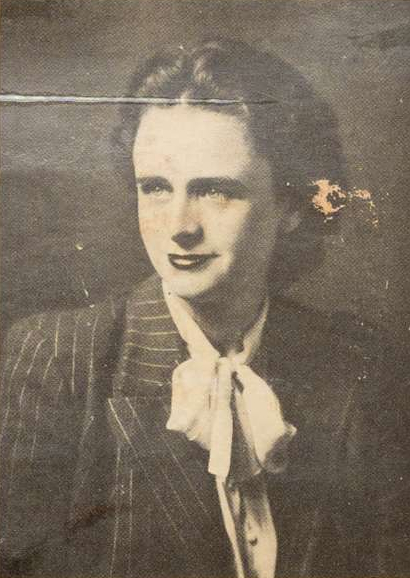
- Forbes-Robertson c. 1941
- Born: Diana Forbes-Robertson; 1914; London, England
- Died: 1988 (aged 73–74); London, England
- Writing career
- Language: English

Diana Forbes-Robertson (14 December 1914 – 9 December 1987) was a British writer.

The daughter of Sir Johnston Forbes-Robertson and Gertrude Forbes-Robertson, Lady Forbes-Robertson, both actors, she was born in London and grew up in Kent. She spent her early years with her sisters Jean, Chloe and Maxine (known as Blossom) at Hartsbourne Manor, the home of her aunt Maxine Elliott, a wing of which was used exclusively by Miles's parents.

She was educated at boarding schools and at a French school in London. In 1935, she married Vincent Sheean, an American journalist. The couple travelled to Spain, Czechoslovakia and other parts of Europe before moving to the United States. During their travels, Forbes-Robertson wrote for the New York Herald Tribune. The couple divorced in 1946 and remarried in 1949. They had two daughters. She and her husband lived for a number of years in Italy, where he died in 1975.

Forbes-Robertson died at the age of 72 in St Stephen's Hospital in London from a stroke while also suffering from pneumonia.

== Selected books ==
- The Battle of Waterloo Road (1941) with photographs by Robert Capa
- War Letters From Britain (1941), edited with Roger Williams Straus Jr.
- A Cat and a King novel (1949)
- My Aunt Maxine biography of her aunt Maxine Elliott (1964)
