= Civil Air Guard =

Aviation Training

The Civil Air Guard (C.A.G.) was established by the UK Government in July 1938 to encourage and subsidise pilot training as the prospect of another war loomed. Subsidised tuition for members of participating civilian flying clubs was offered in exchange for an 'honorable undertaking' that in an emergency members would serve in the Royal Air Force Volunteer Reserve. Members of the Civil Air Guard organization used a dark blue boilersuit uniform (usually privately purchased) and badges supplied for distinction. When civil aviation ceased not long before the war began in September 1939, most members of the Civil Air Guard enlisted in either the Royal Air Force or the Fleet Air Arm.

== The Civil Air Guard scheme ==
On 23 July 1938, Sir Kingsley Wood, Secretary of State for Air, announced the creation of the Civil Air Guard scheme. Its intention was to provide pilots who could assist the Royal Air Force in a time of emergency. The scheme was civilian in nature and established in conjunction with local flying clubs. Membership was open to any person between the ages of 18 and 50 years.

The Air Ministry already offered a grant of £25 to pilot members of flying clubs who obtained an 'A' type licence. As part of the new scheme, if they volunteered for the Civil Air Guard, the grant would be increased to £50 for those trained on standard types of aircraft or £30 for aircraft that are lighter than 1,200 pounds (544 kg). The renewal grant would be increased from £10 to £15. Members would receive flying training at subsidised rates of either 2s 6d or 5s an hour during the week, and 5s or 10s at weekends. The maximum subsidy of £2000 for each club would not apply to those in the Air Guard. The Air Ministry also lifted a restriction on the use of foreign aircraft for training by the flying clubs. Previously, only British-built aircraft could be used if the club wanted Ministry subsidies.

=== Governance of the scheme ===
To control the organisation, five commissioners were appointed. The Chairman of the Commissioners was Lord Londonderry and the Commissioners were:

1. Air Commodore John Adrian Chamier (Secretary for the Commissioners)
2. William Lindsay Everard (a Member of Parliament)
3. Major Alan Goodfellow (former First World War pilot, and Chairman of the Royal Aero Club and the General Council of Associated Light Aeroplane Clubs)
4. Maxine (Blossom) Miles (aviator and aircraft designer)
5. Robert Murray (President of the Glasgow Corporation Transport Flying Club).

The Commissioners held their first meeting on 29 August 1938 at Ariel House, Strand in London.

== Popularity and evolution of the Civil Air Guard ==
The organisation already had 23,647 members with the 75 flying clubs in the scheme. The first training flight commenced on 1 September 1938. At the time, 1,500 (6%) of the existing 23,647 members were available for training.

Within a few weeks of the Air Ministry July announcement more than 13,350 new people had inquired about joining, although only 6,900 had actually enrolled in a flying club. Later, on 8 October 1938, the Air Ministry announced that over 30,000 applications had been received.

The scheme had created a demand for more flying instructors so the Air Ministry created a temporary Assistant Flying Instructor certificate that could be obtained after just 100 hours solo flying, rather than 250 hours for the full certificate.

On 24 January 1939, as the prospect of war became more imminent, Civil Air Guard licence holders were classed into three groups:

1. Class "A", subdivided as:
  - Class A1 - Men between 18 and 30 years who might become service pilots in wartime
  - Class A2 - Men over 30 years with instructional experience, or considerable flying experience who might become service pilots or instructors.
2. Class "B" - Men between 18 and 40 years, who for various reasons would not be considered as Class "A", who might be able to do other service flying duties such as wireless operator, air gunner or observer.
3. Class "C" - Men not in A or B, and all women, who might be suitable as ferry pilots, air ambulance or general communications pilots.

Members who could not classed in any of these groups were advised to look for some other form of national service.

Selected members of all three groups would get additional subsidised training and were known as starred groups. Class A starred members would also get Royal Air Force medicals.

As the war approached, civil flying ceased and most members of the Civil Air Guard enlisted in either the Royal Air Force or the Fleet Air Arm. Some of the women Civil Air Guard members went on to join the Air Transport Auxiliary. Other members were used for special duties in both civil and military aviation, or moved on to other non-aviation war duties.

== See also ==
- Civil Defense
- Civil Air Patrol
- Civil Air Support
