= The Wakefield Case =

1921 film

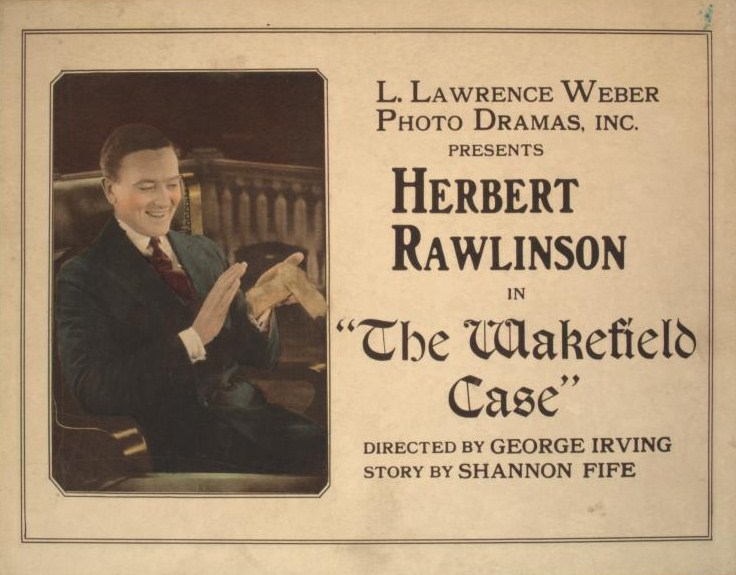
- Directed by: George Irving
- Written by: Shannon Fife
- Based on: a screen story by Lillian Case Russell
- Produced by: Lawrence-Weber Photo Dramas
- Starring: Herbert Rawlinson
- Cinematography: William S. Adams
- Distributed by: World Film Company
- Release date: May 1921
- Running time: 6 reels
- Country: United States
- Language: Silent (English intertitles)

The Wakefield Case is a 1921 American silent mystery film directed by George Irving, produced by Lois Weber and starring Herbert Rawlinson. The plot focuses on a theft at the British Museum. It was released through World Film Company.

== Cast ==
- Herbert Rawlinson as Wakefield Jr.
- John P. Wade as Wakefield Sr.
- J. H. Gilmour as Gregg
- Charles Dalton as Richard Krogan
- Joseph Burke as James Krogan
- Jere Austin as Bryson (credited as Jerry Austin)
- William Black as Blaine (credited as W. W. Black)
- H. L. Dewey as Briggs
- Florence Billings as Ruth Gregg

== Preservation status ==
The Wakefield Case has been preserved in the Library of Congress collection.
