= Fighting Odds =

1917 film by Allan Dwan

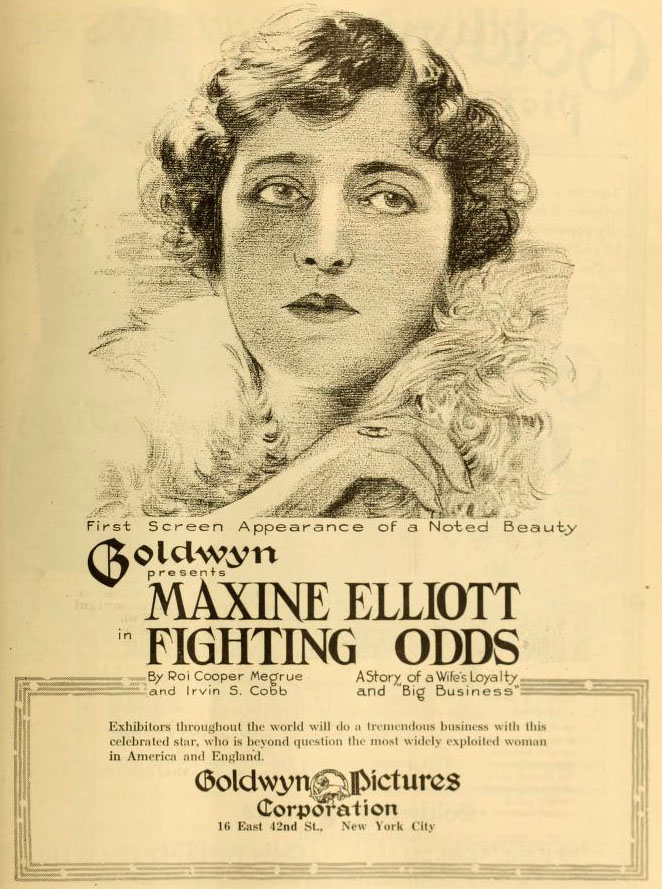
- Directed by: Allan Dwan
- Based on: Under Sentence by Irvin S. Cobb and Roi Cooper Megrue
- Produced by: Arthur Hopkins
- Starring: Maxine Elliott
- Cinematography: René Guissart
- Distributed by: Goldwyn Pictures
- Release date: September 30, 1917
- Running time: 6 reels
- Country: United States
- Language: Silent (English intertitles)

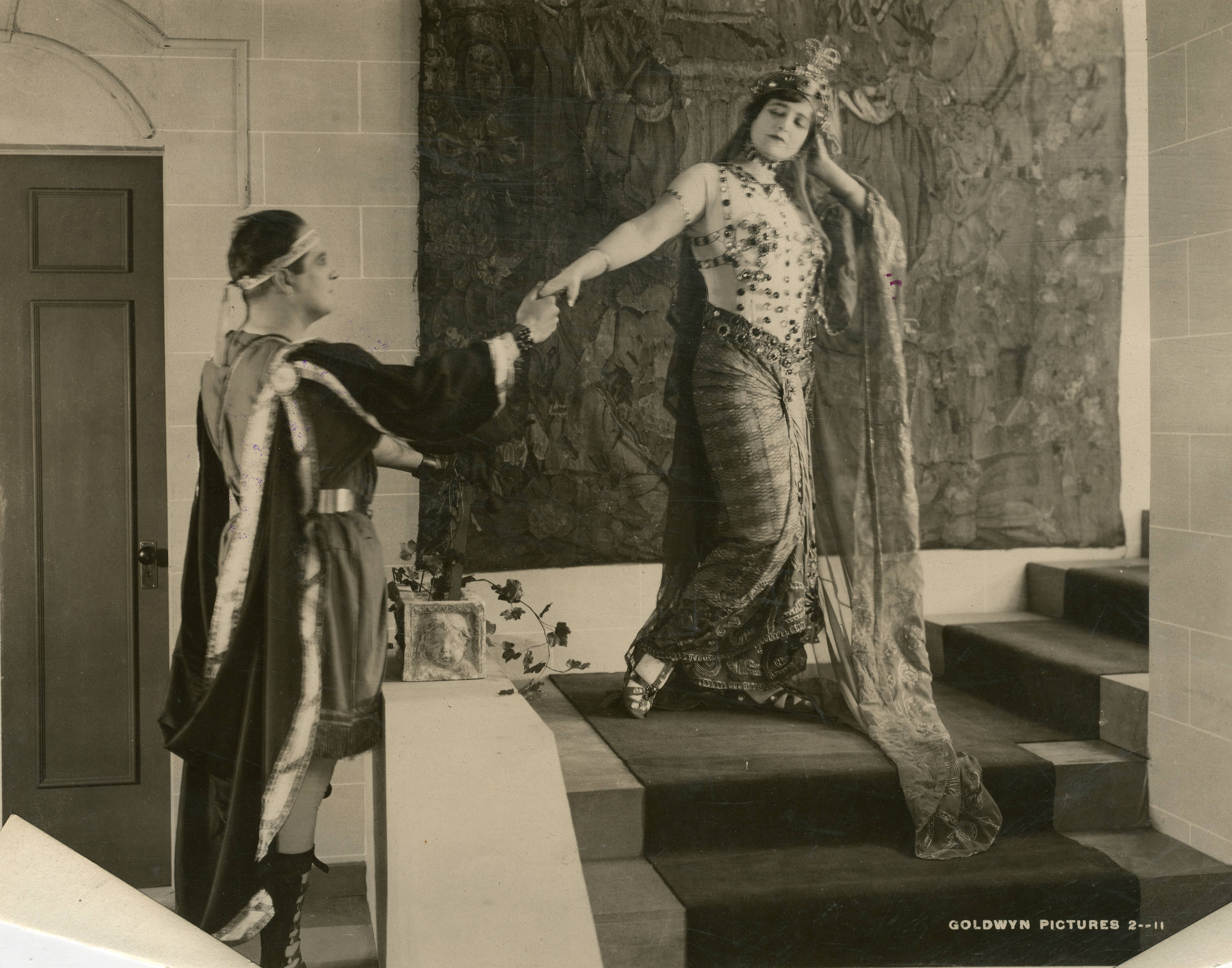
Maxine Elliot in a scene from "Fighting Odds"

Fighting Odds is a 1917 American silent drama film produced and distributed by Goldwyn Pictures and starring stage beauty Maxine Elliott. The film is based on the play Under Sentence by Irvin S. Cobb and Roi Cooper Megrue. The picture was amongst Goldwyn's first productions as an independent producer. It was directed by veteran Allan Dwan and is a surviving film at the Museum of Modern Art, New York, and Gosfilmofond in Russia.

== Plot ==
As described in a film magazine, James Copley, through his generosity to his employees, wins their confidence and the enmity of John W. Blake, known as a breaker of men and fortunes. By making Copley president of Amalgamated Motors Company, Blake succeeds in ruining Copley and sending him to prison. His wife decides to free her husband and put Blake where he belongs. Through the old method of vampiring, Mrs. Copley succeeds in securing the evidence that frees her husband and puts Blake behind bars.

== Cast ==
- William T. Carleton as District Attorney
- Henry Clive as Mr. Copley
- Charles Dalton as John W. Blake
- Maxine Elliott as Mrs. Copley
- Eric Hudson as Detective Butler
- Regan Hughston as Jewett
- George Odell as Egan
