= The Battle of Waterloo Road =

Photographic book by Robert Capa and Diana Forbes-Robertson

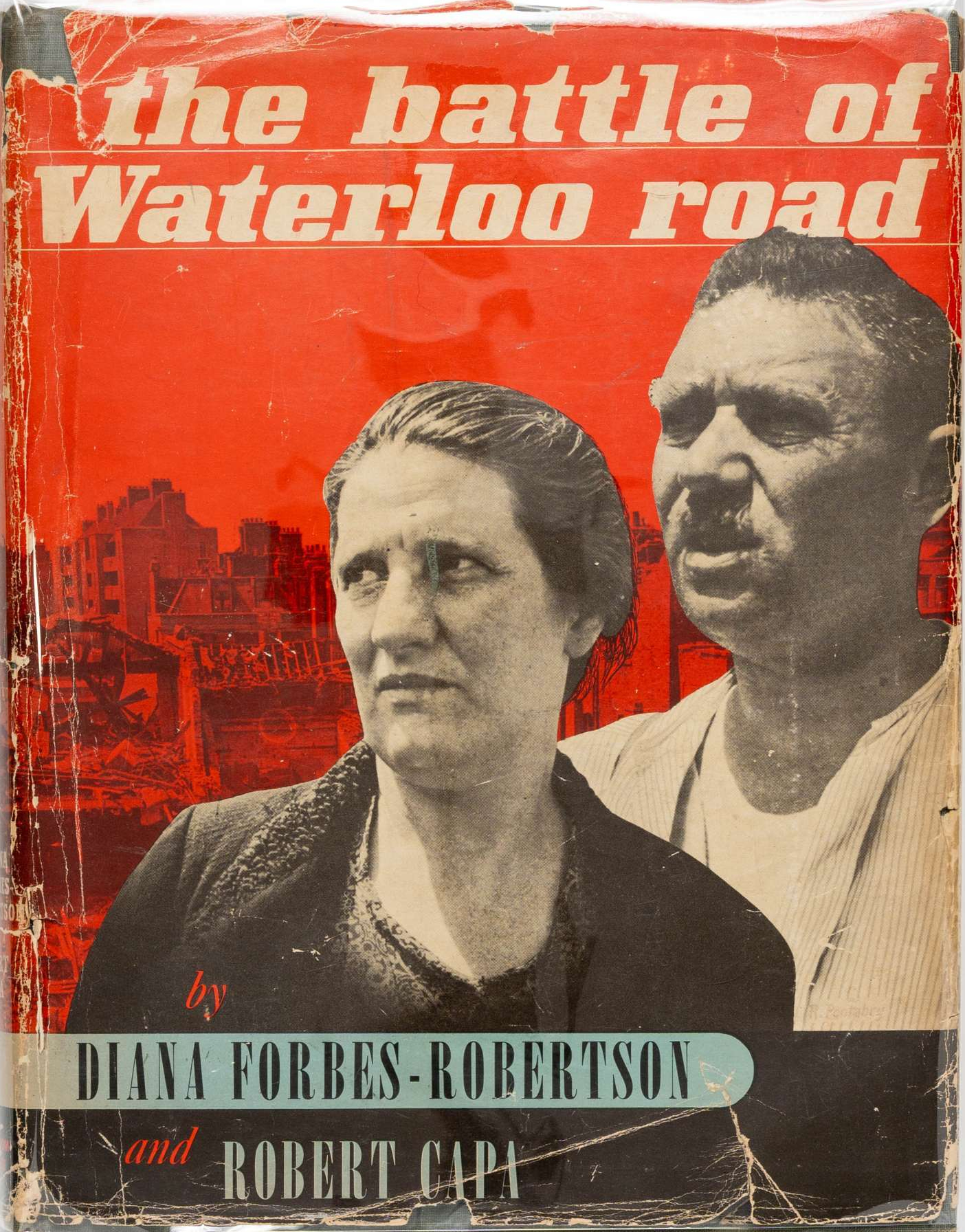
- Author: Diana Forbes-Robertson
- Illustrator: Robert Capa
- Language: English
- Publisher: Random House
- Publication date: 1941
- Publication place: United States

The Battle of Waterloo Road is a book written by British journalist Diana Forbes-Robertson and illustrated with photographs by Hungarian photographer Robert Capa in the aftermath of the German bombings of London, in 1940 and 1941. The book was published by Random House, of New York, in 1941. It was the second photographic book published by Capa.

== History and content ==
Forbes-Robertson and Capa were commissioned by Random House to make a book about how an English family was enduring the Blitz, and arrived in London in May 1941. They met Father Charles Hutchinson who introduced them to the Gibbs family. Capa took all his pictures in the months of June and July 1941. He deliberately focused on several individuals who had witnessed the German bombing of London, and the book is named after Waterloo Road, located in Lambeth, a working-class district of London. The title of the book makes a parallel between Waterloo Battle, fought between the British Army, led by the Duke of Wellington and the French Army of Napoleon, in 1815, and the struggle the residents of the city had to do against the forces of Nazi Germany. Like Forbes-Robertson wrote in the book: "Their everydayness is an answer to Hitler."

The book focus on several residents of Waterloo Road, mainly four figures, Tom Gibbs, a policeman, Mrs. Gardner, a charwoman of the Air Ministry, Father Hutchinson, the retired Anglican vicar of the Church of St. John, in Waterloo Road, and Frank Hibbs, a superintendent at a Lambeth tenement and a lieutenant of the Home Guard. Their lives at the time are documented in several pictures.

Nicolaus Mills wrote: "Capa's photos aren't compelling in their use of light or background, but significantly, time and again, he made sure that his camera lens was positioned below his subjects. We continually look up at people in the most telling photos in The Battle of Waterloo Road." He also stated that "Capa's photos are worthy companion pieces to the moving shelter drawings that the sculptor Henry Moore did of Londoners spending their nights in underground subway stations in order to keep safe during German bombing raids. At the heart of Capa's war photos of London's citizens is the same mix of camaraderie and vulnerability that Moore depicted."
