= Charles Dalton (actor) =

English actor (1864–1942)

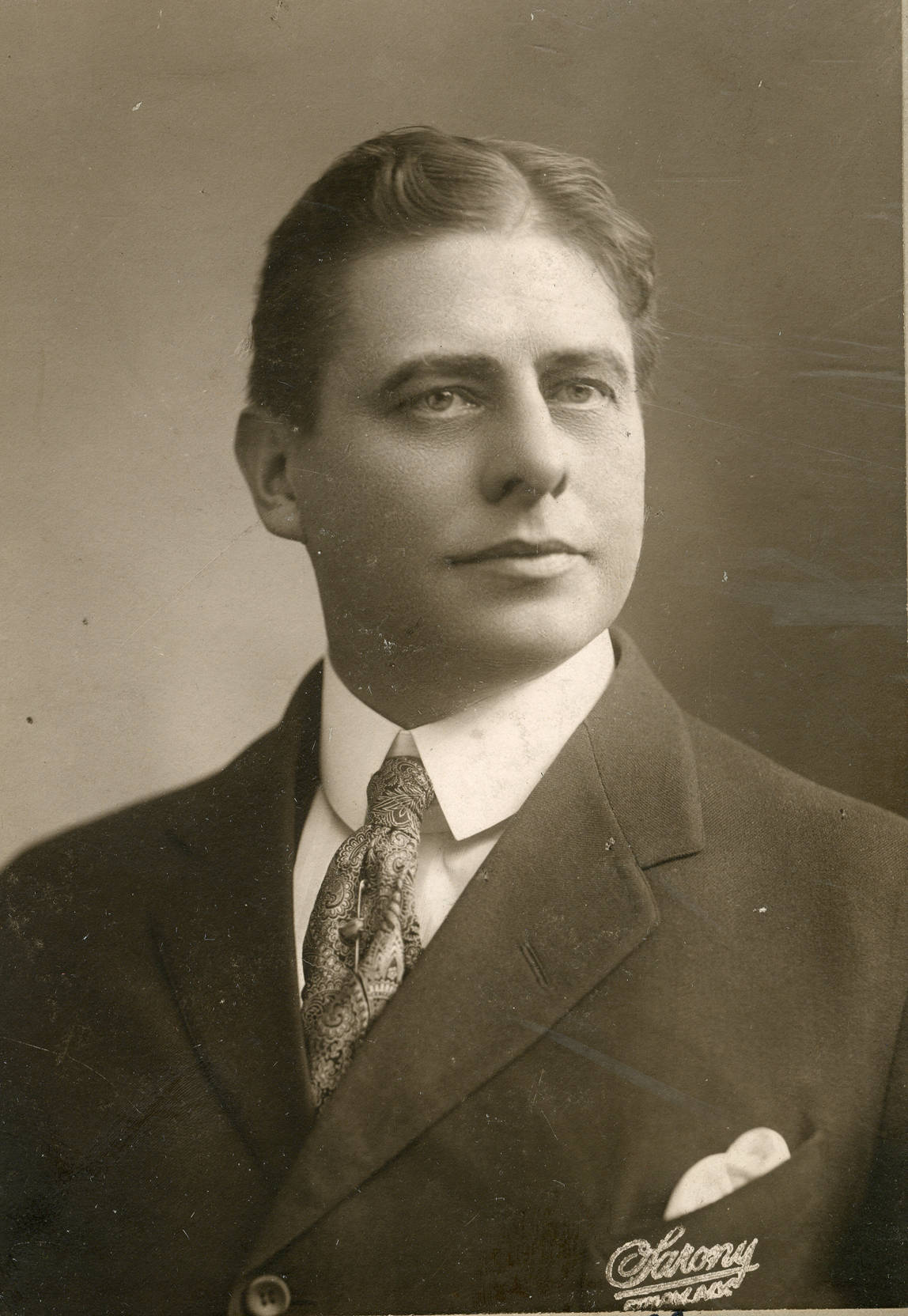
- Born: 29 August 1864; Rochester, Kent, England
- Died: 11 June 1942 (aged 77); Stamford, Connecticut, US
- Resting place: Kensico Cemetery, Valhalla, New York
- Occupation: actor
- Spouse: Rita Walton

Charles Dalton (1864–1942) was an English born stage actor who had a lengthy Broadway career. He made his first stage appearance in 1883 and toured the English provinces for over a decade before heading to New York City in 1896. He appeared in 1896 in a production of Wilson Barrett's The Sign of the Cross. His last Broadway appearance was in 1940 in a production of Richard II.

== Filmography ==
- Fighting Odds (1917)
- The Wakefield Case (1921)
