= Maxine Blossom Miles =

English aircraft engineer (1914–1987)

Maxine "Blossom" Miles
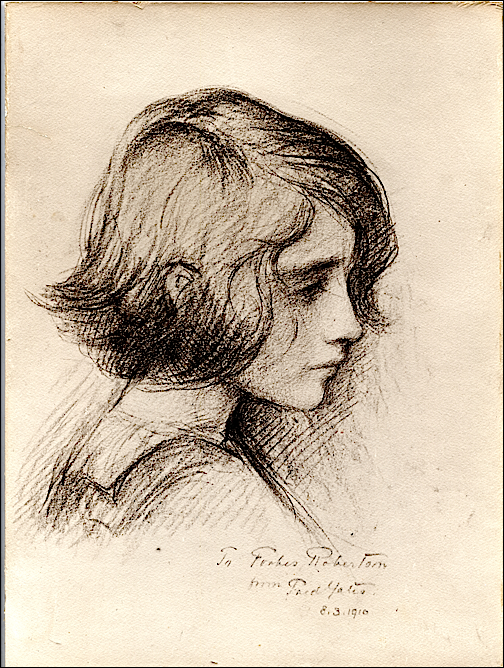
- Blossom aged 9 by Frederic Yates
- Born: Maxine Frances Mary Forbes-Robertson; 22 September 1901; Blackheath, Kent, England
- Died: 6 April 1984 (aged 82); Worthing
- Other name: Blossom / Maxine Freeman-Thomas / Maxine Miles
- Occupation: Aircraft designer
- Known for: Aviator, socialite, businesswoman
- Spouse(s): Inigo Freeman-Thomas; Frederick George Miles
- Children: Jeremy John Miles, Mary Miles

Maxine Frances Mary "Blossom" Miles (née Forbes-Robertson; 22 September 1901 – 6 April 1984) was a British aviation engineer, socialite, businesswoman, engraver, costume designer, and gardener. She was born into a well-known family of actors. She became interested in aviation in the 1920s, and married her flight instructor, Frederick George Miles. Together they eventually founded Miles Aircraft, where she was a draughtswoman and aircraft designer.

== Early life ==
Maxine Forbes-Robertson was born in 1901 to actors Sir Johnston Forbes-Robertson and Gertrude Elliott. Her father was acclaimed, and his family was at the heart of London society. A privileged but grounded upbringing ensured that "Blossom", as she was known in her family, was able to develop her intellectual, sporting, and artistic abilities to the full, despite losing an eye at an early age. She was no stranger to the theatre and appeared on the London stage with members of her family on occasion.

Maxine spent her early years with her parents Gertrude Elliott and Johnston Forbes-Robertson, and sisters Jean, Chloe and Diana at Hartsbourne Manor, the home of her aunt Maxine Elliott, a wing of which was used exclusively by Miles's parents. The house, formerly the family seat of Sir Thomas Thompson is now a private members' golf club. The Forbes-Robertsons' main family home was located at 22 Bedford Square in the heart of London's Bloomsbury district.

Forbes-Robertson was a contemporary of Barbara Cartland, with whom she was presented in 1919 as a debutante. Cartland said of Forbes-Robertson: "I do believe that once you know something nasty you can't erase it. That's why when I had my children ... I wouldn't read any racy novels -- because Blossom Forbes-Robertson, who 'came out' with me in 1919, was born with an empty eye socket after her mother acted the role of a one-eyed woman during pregnancy. So I just tried to think beautiful thoughts."

As a 'bright young thing' along with Lady Diana Cooper and Elsa Maxwell, Forbes-Robertson organised 'treasure hunt' parties across London.

== Marriages ==
Maxine married Captain Hon Inigo Freeman-Thomas (later 2nd Marquess of Willingdon), son of Freeman Freeman-Thomas, 1st Marquess of Willingdon and Lady Marie Brassey, on 8 October 1924. Her married name became Freeman-Thomas. Maxine Elliott (her Aunt) gave Freeman-Thomas a $500,000 dowry on announcement of her marriage, and the couple lived for a time in Miss Elliott's Regents Park home. Maxine's sister, Diana, was to write that Maxine Elliott had swept Maxine's first marriage out of the hands of her parents.

In 1930 Blossom and Inigo, her husband, joined Cecil Pashley's Southern Aero Club at Shoreham Airport. Their flying instructor was Frederick George Miles. In February 1931, Blossom and Inigo were having a low-wing monoplane built at Shoreham Airport. They planned to fly to India, where Freeman-Thomas's father had been appointed Viceroy. On 7 December 1931, The New York Times reported that Viscount Ratendone (Inigo Freeman-Thomas) was seeking a divorce from Viscountess Ratendone (Maxine Freeman-Thomas).

"Her husband, the Viscount, was the money behind the fledgling flying school owned by Fred and his partners. In emotional turmoil, Fred sold out his portion of the business, bought a trainer plane and shipped it to Cape Town, South Africa, to start a new life. "

Freeman-Thomas named Frederick George Miles, flying instructor, as co-defendant with Maxine in an undefended suit and was granted a decree nisi. Maxine and Inigo Freeman-Thomas were divorced in 1932. Both Maxine and Freeman-Thomas had been members of the Southern Aero Club of Shoreham, where Miles was a director and instructor. Miles flew his Simmonds Spartan aircraft to South Africa to escape the situation and consider his position; almost immediately he returned. On 6 August 1932 Maxine and Miles were married at Holborn Registry Office.

Blossom and Fred had two children, Jeremy born in 1933 and Mary Susannah born in 1939. The couple's home, Lands' End in Twyford, Berkshire, was of a contemporary modern design, Blossom's taste.

In 1938, Blossom was a Commissioner of the Civil Air Guard, established July 1938, to encourage and subsidize pilot training.

Blossom later designed costumes for a revival of the show Berkeley Square at the Vaudeville Theatre in London.

== Aviation ==
Maxine gained her aviation certificate (Royal Aero Club certificate 9585) through her membership in the Southern Aero Club. One of the first aircraft she owned was a De Havilland DH.60X Cirrus Moth, registered G-EBZG, in 1928, after it had been damaged on landing at Shoreham, sold to Southern Aircraft Ltd, and rebuilt; it was then named "Jemimah".

Of the aircraft Blossom helped design, the Miles Sparrowhawk, is one of the most notable. F. G. Miles decided to compete in the 1935 King’s Cup Air Race and the job of producing a suitable aircraft fell to Maxine, who had just eight weeks to produce an aeroplane. With neither the time or the facilities to create something from scratch, she took a Miles Hawk, shortened the fuselage, improved the streamlining, reduced the wingspan by 5 ft, reduced the height of the undercarriage, moved the legs outwards and away from the propeller slipstream and, finally, installed extra tanks to enable the 140 hp Gypsy Major engine to complete the 953-mile course with only a single re-fuelling stop.

The Miles Trio (George, Fred and Blossom) designs used extensively by the RAF included the Miles Hawk and Miles Master, both of which were used as training aircraft for Hurricane and Spitfire pilots.

== Positions and appointments ==
Maxine (Blossom) was a director of Phillip and Powis Aircraft Ltd, and later, when that company was purchased by her husband and brother-in-law, a shareholder of Miles Aircraft Ltd. Within the Miles company, Blossom Miles was a draughtswoman as well as looking after the social and welfare issues faced by the rapidly expanding company. In 1943 The Miles Aeronautical Technical School opened under her directorship. She designed the Miles Hawk G-ACIZ aircraft which Gabrielle Patterson, Britain's first woman flying instructor (and later one of the "first eight" women pilots in the Air Transport Auxiliary) flew in the King's Cup air race in 1934.

Blossom served as one of five commissioners of the Civil Air Guard which was established in July 1938 to encourage and subsidise pilot training. Formed around civilian flying clubs, subsidised tuition was offered in exchange for an 'honourable undertaking' that in times of emergency, members would serve in the Royal Air Force Reserve.

In 1942, she was a guest speaker at the Women’s Engineering Society's Annual Dinner, help at the Forum Club, speaking on Women in the Drawing Office, based on her personal experiences working on aircraft engineering and training up other women in the field during World War Two. Seven hundred women applied for the first 16 training places at the Phillip and Powis Aircraft Ltd, offered as part of supporting the war effort. Gertrude Entwistle, President of the Women’s Engineering Society stated that they were "proud to count Mrs Miles a member. She would have felt the society would have failed if Mrs Miles had not been a member".

== Bibliography ==
- Brown, Don Lambert. Miles Aircraft Since 1925. London: Putnam & Company Ltd., 1970. ISBN 0-370-00127-3.
