= Jean Forbes-Robertson =

English actress (1905–1962)

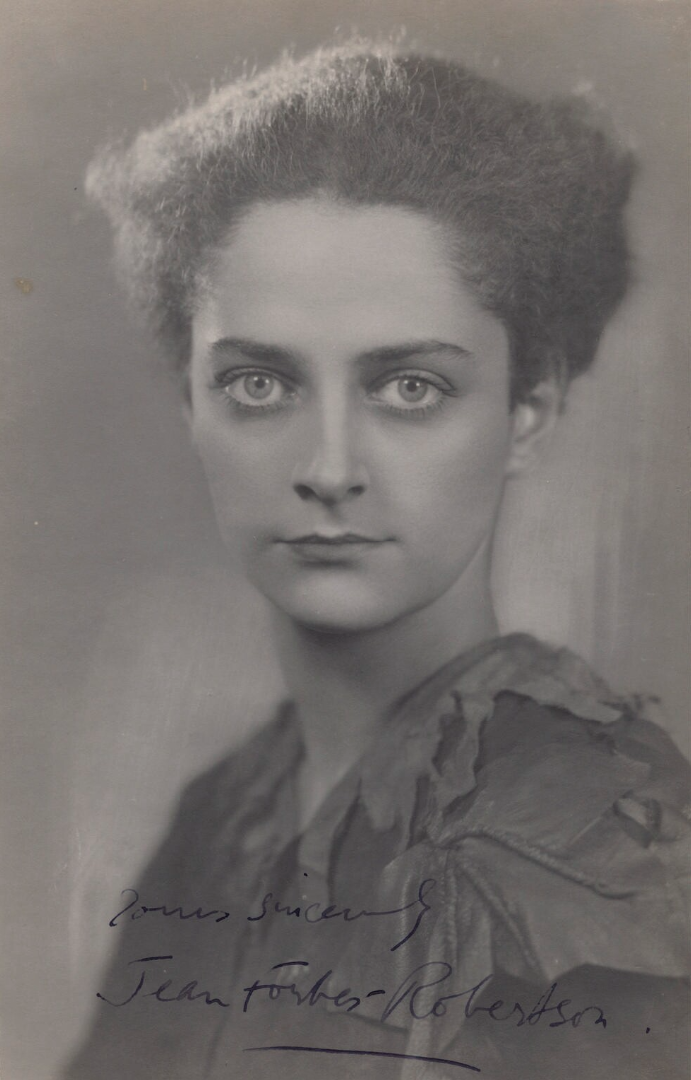
Jean Forbes-Robertson photographed in 1932 by Sasha.

Jean Forbes-Robertson as Peter Pan, c. 1927

Jean Forbes-Robertson (16 March 1905 – 24 December 1962) was an English actress. A versatile Shakespearean actress, she was often cast in boys' roles because of her slim build, playing Jim Hawkins in a stage version of Treasure Island, Puck in A Midsummer Night's Dream and, most famously, the title role in Peter Pan.

After beginning her career in 1921 on tour in South Africa and Australasia with her mother's theatre company, she made her London debut in 1925, gaining wide notice by 1927. She played mostly in Shakespeare works and other classic plays, and was often employed by the actor-director Robert Atkins. Her father was the actor Johnston Forbes-Robertson, her mother was the actress Gertrude Elliott, her aunt the American actress Maxine Elliott, and her daughter is the actress Joanna Van Gyseghem.

== Early years and Peter Pan ==
Forbes-Robertson was born in London, the second daughter of the actors Johnston Forbes-Robertson and Gertrude Elliott. She spent her early years with her parents, sisters Maxine (known as Blossom), Chloe and Diana and aunt Maxine Elliott at her aunt's Bushey Heath, Hertfordshire home, Hartsbourne Manor, where a wing was used exclusively by the Forbes-Robertsons.

Forbes-Robertson began her professional stage career in South Africa in 1921 in a production of Paddy, the Next Best Thing produced by her mother. She toured in Australasia in her mother's company until 1925, when she appeared in London in Dancing Mothers opposite her mother at the Queen's Theatre. She gained wider notice in 1927 as Helen Pettigrew in Berkeley Square and Juliet in Romeo and Juliet, impressing the critics with her emotional range. That year, she first played the title character in Peter Pan, a role that she would repeat annually during the Christmas season until 1935 and in 1938–39 in London, and also on tour, gaining wide renown for her portrayal.

== Peak career ==
In 1928, she appeared at the Old Vic Theatre in a season of plays directed by Andrew Leigh that included Hamlet, The School for Scandal, King Lear as Cordelia, The Merchant of Venice, and Everyman. She played the title role in Hedda Gabler in 1931. In 1932, she played the dual role of Viola/Cesario in Twelfth Night at the New Theatre, directed by Robert Atkins, and appeared in Strange Orchestra by Rodney Ackland, directed by John Gielgud at St. Martin's Theatre. Forbes-Robertson was sometimes seen as an intellectual rather than a highly dramatic actress: in The Manchester Guardian Ivor Brown called her Hedda Gabler "a beautiful miniature". On the other hand, St John Ervine in The Observer wrote that he had "never witnessed anything so beautiful as Miss Forbes-Robertson's performance" as the heroine of Romeo and Juliet; and in Twelfth Night, Brown said of her performance as Viola/Cesario, "her complete absorption in romance is so simple, so 'unactressy' as to open up the play anew."

Forbes-Robertson played Oberon in A Midsummer Night's Dream at the Open Air Theatre in Regent's Park, London, in 1933, directed by Atkins. The next year, she appeared in The Lady of the Camellias, as Marguerite Gautier, at the Brighton Theatre Royal. In 1936, she appeared in Ibsen's Rosmersholm and Hedda Gabler in Cambridge and then in London, as well as Titania, this time, in A Midsummer Night's Dream in Regent's Park with Atkins. She created the role of Catherine on Broadway in Promise by H. M. Harwood, which opened on 30 December 1936. In 1937, she appeared in J.B. Priestley's Time and the Conways at the Duchess Theatre, and that summer she took the role of Puck in A Midsummer Night's Dream in Regent's Park, again directed by Atkins. The Times called her interpretation "a darkly purposeful goblin of mischief lending to Puck's innate attractiveness a rare grace of speech and gesture". In 1938, she appeared in Twelfth Night and was again in A Midsummer Night's Dream at Regent's Park, directed by Atkins.

== Later years and family ==
She continued to act in London into the 1940s, appearing in 1945 in Quality Street at the Embassy Theatre, directed by Anthony Hawtrey, and was still spry enough to play Jim Hawkins in a stage version of Treasure Island at the Granville Theatre the same year. In 1951, she appeared on television in Sunday Night Theatre in Season 2, Episode 38, as Birdie Hubbard in the BBC's production of The Little Foxes. In 1953, she published two children's stories, Chowry and Idle's Islands – Two Tales of Fantasy.

She was married first to Jamie Hamilton in 1929; the marriage ended in 1933. In 1940 she married Andre Van Gyseghem, and the couple had a daughter, Joanna Van Gyseghem. Forbes-Robertson's sisters were Maxine ("Blossom"), an aviation engineer; Chloe an artist (1909–1947); and Diana, an author. Her aunt was the actress Maxine Elliott.

She died in London at age 57.
