= Maxine Elliott =

American actress and businesswoman (1868–1940)

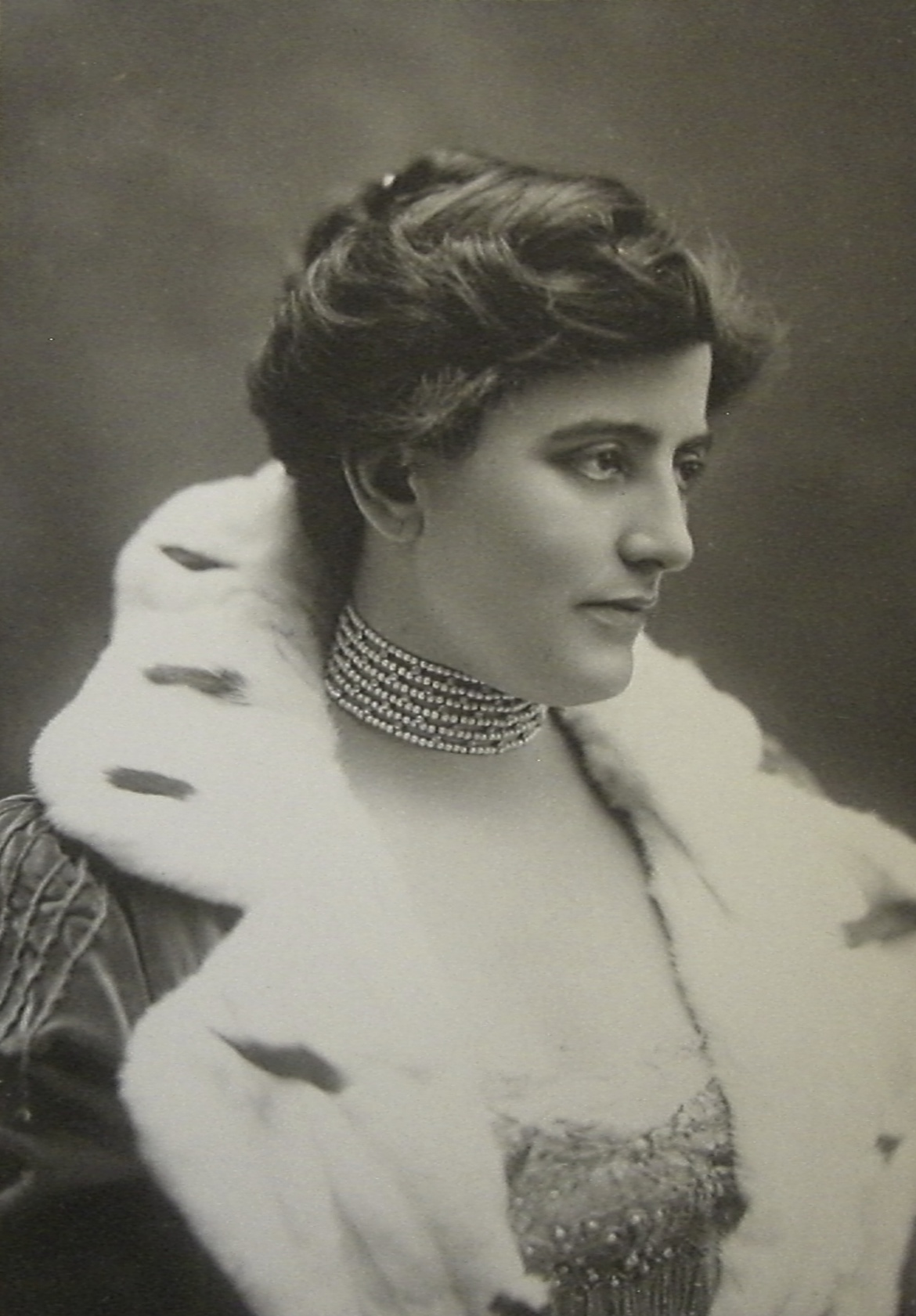
- Maxine Elliott, c. 1905, by Burr McIntosh
- Born: Jessie Dermott; February 5, 1868; Rockland, Maine, U.S.
- Died: March 5, 1940 (aged 72); Cannes, France
- Occupations: Film and stage actress; Businesswoman
- Relatives: Gertrude Elliott (sister)

Maxine Elliott (February 5, 1868 – March 5, 1940), also known as Little Jessie, Dettie, or by her birth name Jessie Dermot(t), was an American actress and businesswoman. She managed her own theater and experimented with silent films in the 1910s. Immensely popular, she was rumored to have had intimate relationships with highly notable people such as King Edward VII and J.P. Morgan. During World War I, she was active on the cause of the Belgian relief.

== Early life ==
Born on February 5, 1868, to Thomas Dermot, a sea captain and Adelaide Hill Dermot, she had a younger sister, actress Gertrude Elliott and at least two brothers, one of whom, a sailor, was lost at sea in the Indian Ocean.

By age 15 in 1883, Jessie had been seduced and made pregnant by a 25-year-old man whom she may have married underage, according to the biography by Diana Forbes-Robertson, her niece. She either miscarried or lost the baby. This incident left a psychological wound on her for the rest of her life.

Eliott later developed a relationship with a man from a rich local family, Arthur Hall. When suspicions of her pregnancy developed and when her relationship with Hall was eventually exposed, her father and she left for South America. In her later years, she would make bitter remarks about the separation between Hall and her.

== Acting ==
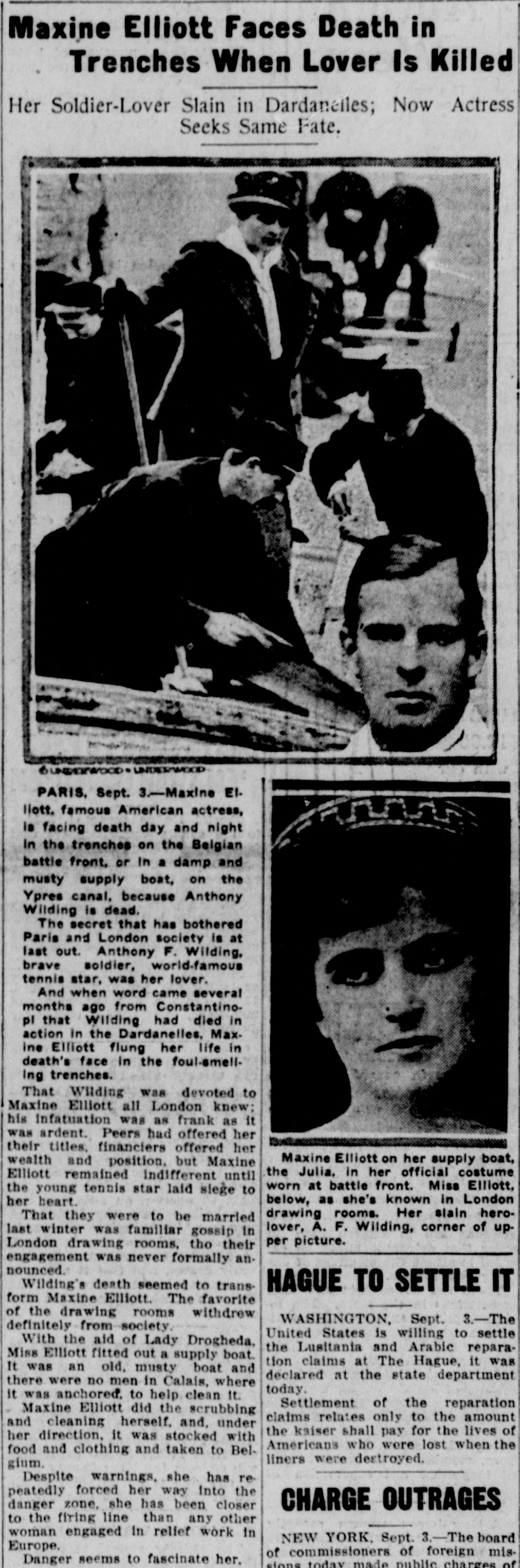
Maxine Elliott story on the front page of September 3, 1915, The Seattle Star

She adopted her stage name Maxine Elliott in 1889, making her first appearance in 1890 in The Middleman.

In 1895, she got her first big break when Augustin Daly hired her as a supporting actress for his star player, Ada Rehan. After divorcing her first husband, Elliott married comedian Nat C. Goodwin in 1898. The two starred together at home and abroad in such hits as Nathan Hale and The Cowboy and the Lady.

For her appearance in a production of The Merchant of Venice, she negotiated a contract for $200 and one-half of the profits over $20,000. She was billed alone when Charles B. Dillingham's production of Her Own Way opened on Broadway on September 28, 1903. From then on, Elliott was a star. When the production moved to London in 1905, King Edward VII asked that she be presented to him, and they were rumoured to have had an intimate relationship.

Goodwin eventually divorced Elliott in 1908. Around this time, she became friendly with financier J. P. Morgan. Some biographers of Morgan claim the 70-year-old Morgan had a sexual relationship with Elliott, but no evidence substantiates these rumours. Assuredly, Morgan gave her financial advice, which helped her become a rich woman. Shortly after divorcing Goodwin, she returned to New York City and in 1908 opened her own theater, The Maxine Elliott, located on 39th Street near Broadway.

She was both owner and manager, and at the time, the only woman in the United States running her own theater. Her first production was The Chaperon. She experimented with acting in silent films in 1913. In that year, she was in Slim Driscoll, Samaritan, When the West Was Young, and A Doll for the Baby, but she soon returned to Britain. In 1913, she started dating New Zealand's tennis star Anthony Wilding, who was over 15 years her junior, with The Seattle Star calling him her lover.

According to the Star, she had planned to marry Wilding, but he was killed on May 9, 1915, at the Battle of Aubers Ridge in World War I. After his death, she reportedly became obsessed with the war and moved to Belgium. There, she volunteered both her income and her time to the cause of the Belgian relief, being rewarded with the Belgian Order of the Crown.

In 1917, Elliott returned to the U.S. and signed with the newly formed Goldwyn Pictures to make the 1917 film Fighting Odds and 1919 film The Eternal Magdalene. Elliott can be seen visiting Charlie Chaplin's studios in 1918 and cavorting with him and her entourage before Chaplin's cameras. Her visit to Chaplin survives and is sometimes included in omnibus videos on Chaplin.

Elliott's last stage appearance was in 1920 in Trimmed in Scarlett, aged 52. She then retired from acting, announcing that she "wished to grow middle-aged gracefully". According to biographer Diana Forbes-Robertson, contemporary critics were divided on whether it was "her beauty or her acting ability that attracted attention" over her career.

== Businesswoman ==
Elliott was successful in both business and investment. She had homes in America, England, and France. A photograph of Winston Churchill (accompanied by his wife, Clementine) working on an oil painting in the grounds of one of her houses, Hartsbourne Manor in England, appears in Andrew Roberts' Churchill: Walking with Destiny.

Elliott's sister Gertrude Elliot with her husband Johnston Forbes-Robertson and their children Maxine "Blossom" Miles, Jean, Chloe and Diana lived in a wing of Hartsbourne Manor. In 1932, she built le Château de l'Horizon near Juan-les-Pins. There, she entertained guests, including Churchill, Lloyd George, and Vincent Sheean. In her old age, diarist "Chips" Channon described her as "an immense bulk of a woman with dark eyes, probably the most amazing eyes one has ever seen", "lovable, fat, oh so fat, witty, and gracious"; he recorded having watched her eat "pat after pat of butter without any bread". Elliott died on March 5, 1940, in Cannes, France, a wealthy woman, at the age of 72.

== Death and legacy ==
Elliott was interred at Protestant Cemetery in Cannes and became the subject of a biography titled My Aunt Maxine: The Story of Maxine Elliot c. 1964, written by her niece, Diana Forbes-Robertson. Her other relatives include British actor Leo Woodall.

== Filmography ==
Year	Title	Role	Notes
1913	From Dusk to Dawn		
1917	Fighting Odds	Mrs. Copley	
1919	The Eternal Magdalene	The Eternal Magdalene	(final film role)

== See also ==
- Mary Pickford
- Edna Goodrich
