= Eric Forbes-Robertson =

British artist (1865–1935)

Eric Forbes-Robertson (1865–1935) was a British figure and landscape painter. He was the brother of two actors Sir Johnston Forbes-Robertson and Norman Forbes-Robertson.

== Biography ==
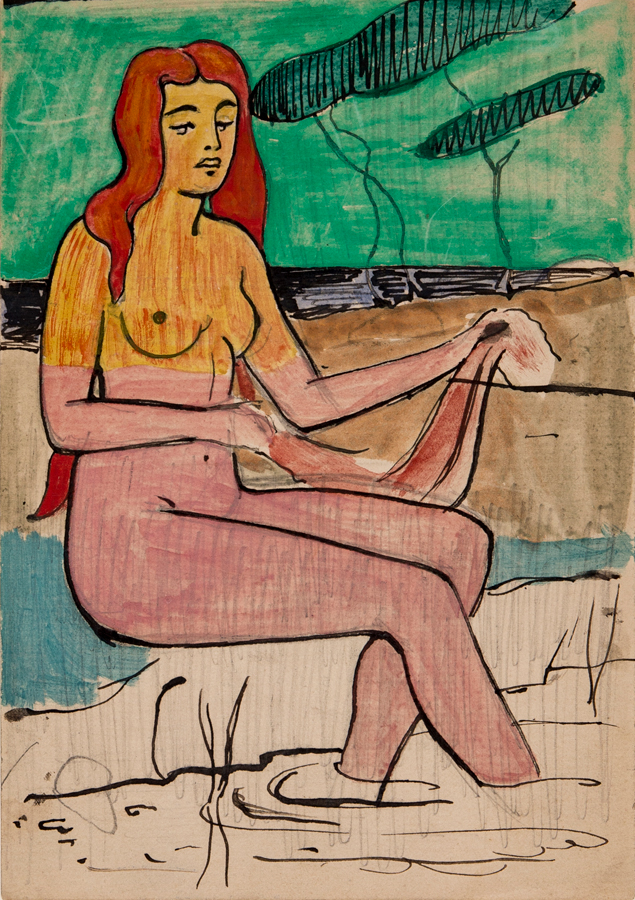
The Bather, possibly Tahitian. Pencil, ink and watercolour

Eric trained at the Académie Julian in Paris in the late 1880s. Amongst the other students at that time were Paul Sérusier, Pierre Bonnard, Édouard Vuillard and Maurice Denis.

In August 1890 he travelled to Pont-Aven, Brittany with his friend and fellow student Robert Polhill Bevan. It was there that he met Paul Gauguin and his name is inscribed along with those of Roderic O'Conor and Armand Séguin in Gauguin's portfolio (now in the Metropolitan Museum of Art).

In 1897 Eric married a Polish art student, Janina Flamm, on the island of Jersey. Her bridesmaid was a fellow Pole Stanisława de Karłowska and it was here that the latter met her future husband Robert Polhill Bevan.

Little is known of the Forbes-Robertsons' later work, although both exhibited at the August 1911 show of the Esperantist Vagabond Club.
