= Gertrude Elliott =

American actress (1874–1950)

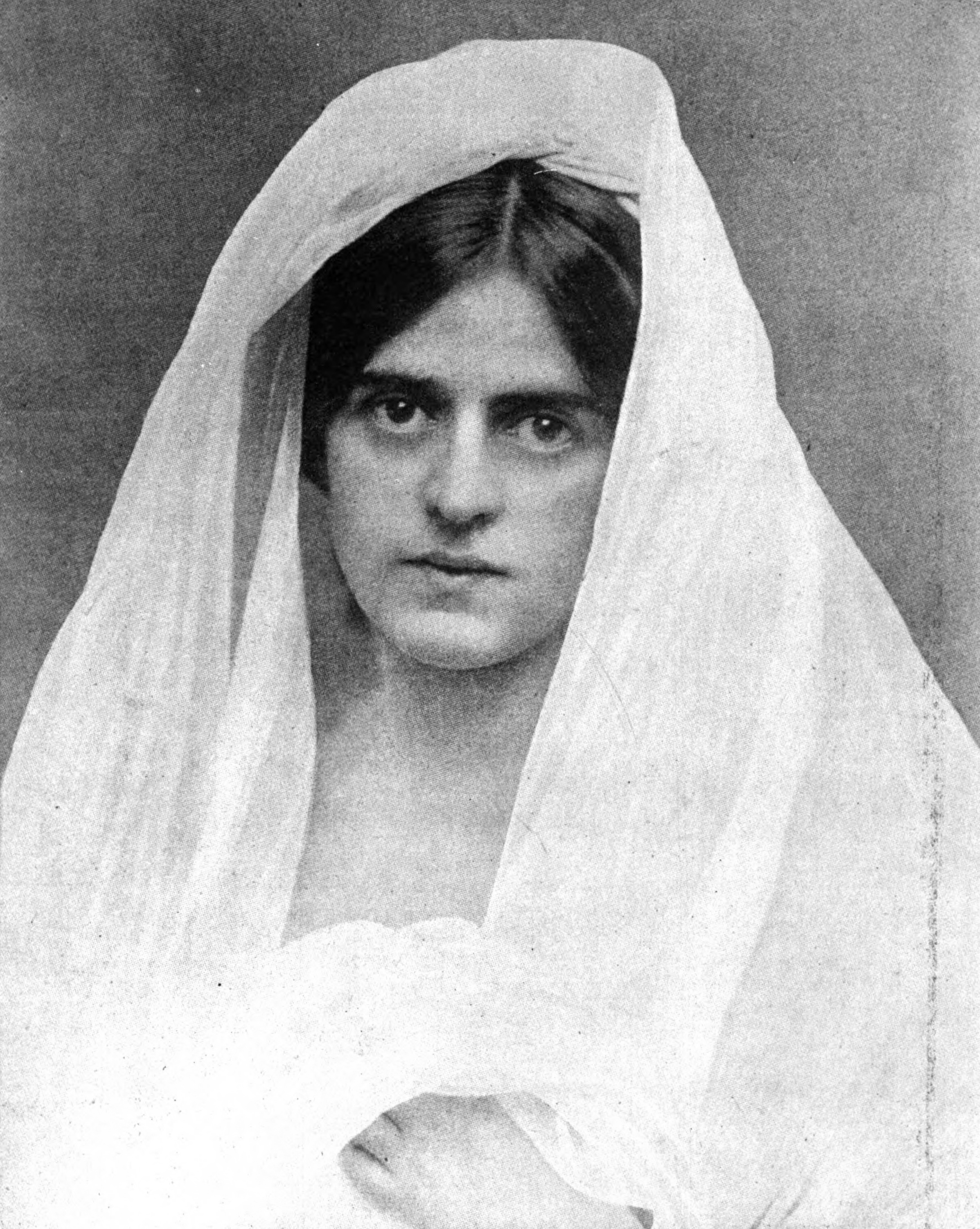
- Born: May Gertrude Dermott; December 14, 1874; Rockland, Maine, U.S.
- Died: December 24, 1950 (aged 76)
- Other names: Lady Forbes-Robertson
- Occupation: Actor
- Spouse: Johnston Forbes-Robertson (m. 1900–1937) his death
- Children: 4, including Maxine (Blossom) Miles, Diana Forbes-Robertson, and Jean Forbes-Robertson
- Relatives: Joanna Van Gyseghem (granddaughter)

Gertrude Elliott (December 14, 1874 – December 24, 1950), later Lady Forbes-Robertson, was an American stage actress, part of an extended family of theatre professionals including her husband, Sir Johnston Forbes-Robertson, and her elder sister, Maxine Elliott. She was President of the Actresses' Franchise League in the UK.

== Early life ==
May Gertrude Dermott was born in Rockland, Maine.

== Career ==
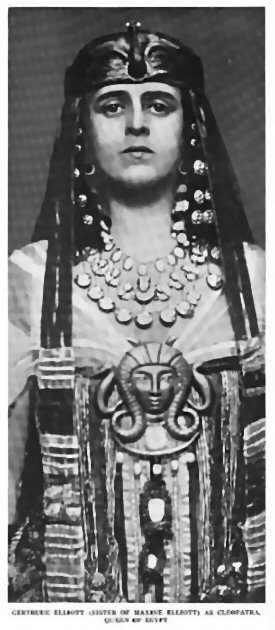
Gertrude Elliott Forbes-Robertson as Cleopatra

Elliott's career on stage began in 1894, with a role in Oscar Wilde's A Woman of No Importance, in a company that was touring New York state. The Elliott sisters joined a company in San Francisco that toured Australia in 1896. The company was run by Nat C. Goodwin, an actor who soon married Maxine Elliott. Their company went to London in 1899, and the next year Elliott was hired into the company of Johnston Forbes-Robertson; Elliott and Forbes-Robertson married at the end of 1900, and continued to work together predominantly in Shakespearean works for much of their careers.

Away from the stage, Elliott starred with her husband in a silent film version of Hamlet in 1913, directed by their friend J. H. Ryley. She also appeared in a 1917 silent film, Masks and Faces. Elliott was a co-founder of the Actresses' Franchise League with Sime Seruya, Winifred Mayo and Adeline Bourne, and served as president. During World War I she managed the "Shakespeare Hut" in Bloomsbury, a project of the YMCA for entertaining and raising morale among war workers. In 1923, New Zealand gave Elliott an award for her work for ANZAC troops during the war.

== Personal life ==
Elliott married English actor Johnston Forbes-Robertson in 1900. They had four daughters, including aircraft designer Maxine (Blossom) Miles, writer Diana Forbes-Robertson, and actress Jean Forbes-Robertson. Johnston was knighted in 1913, making Elliott "Lady Forbes-Robertson" from that time. She was widowed when her husband died in 1937, and Elliott died in 1950, aged 76 years. Her grandchildren include actress Joanna Van Gyseghem.

There is a plaque marking the birthplace of the Elliott sisters in the Trackside Station in Rockland, Maine.
