= Johnston Forbes-Robertson =

English actor (1853–1937)

Sir Johnston Forbes-Robertson
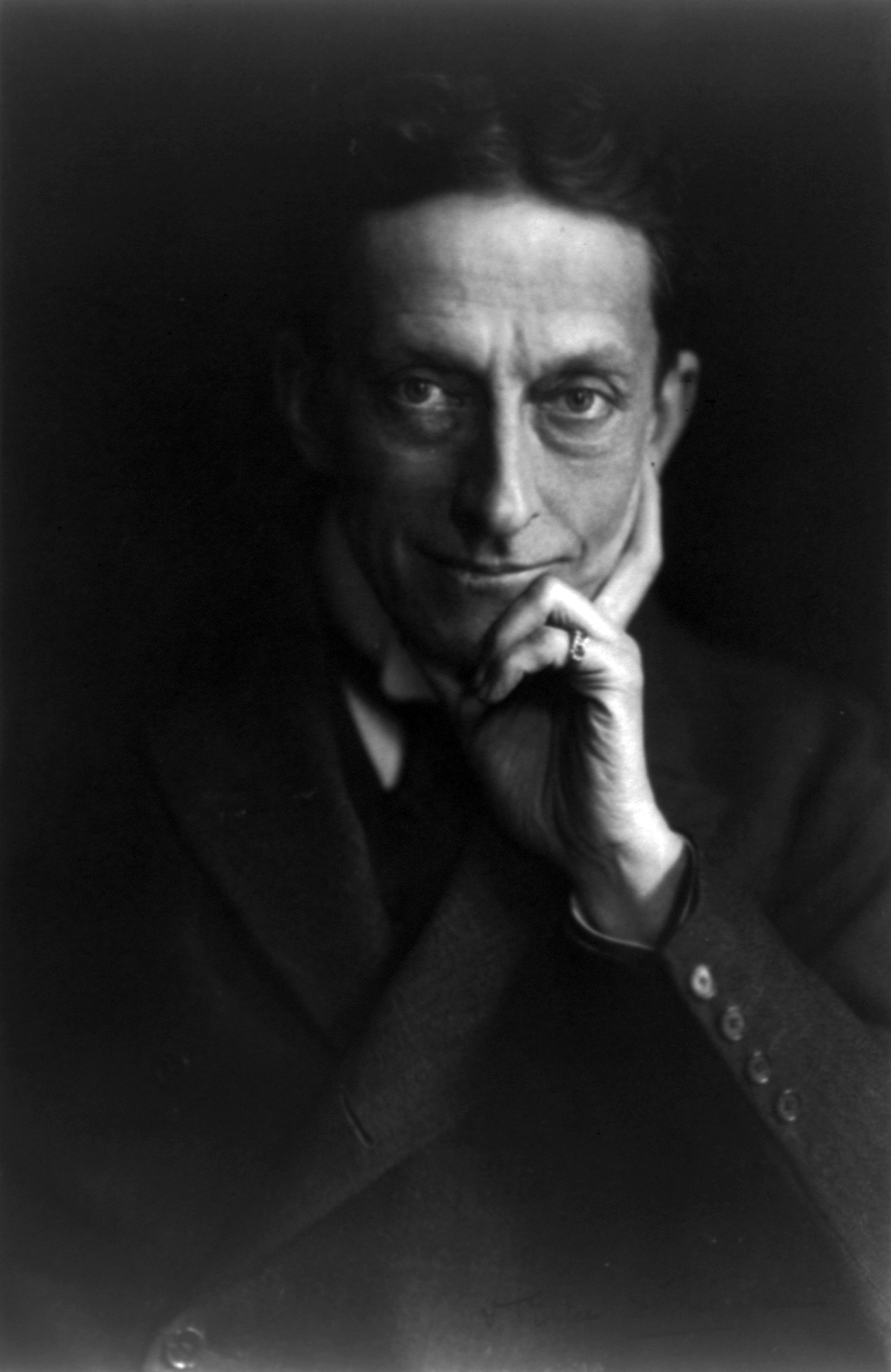
- Born: 16 January 1853; London, England
- Died: 6 November 1937 (aged 84); St. Margaret's Bay, Dover, Kent, England
- Occupation: Actor
- Years active: 1874–1915
- Spouse: Gertrude Elliott
- Children: Maxine Miles; Jean Forbes-Robertson; Chloe Forbes-Robertson; Diana Forbes-Robertson

Sir Johnston Forbes-Robertson (16 January 1853 – 6 November 1937) was an English actor and theatre manager and husband of the actress Gertrude Elliott. Considered by some the finest Hamlet of the Victorian era and one of the finest actors of his time, he disliked acting and believed throughout his career that he was temperamentally unsuited to it.

== Early life and education ==
Born in London, he was the eldest of the eleven children of John Forbes-Robertson, a theatre critic and journalist from Aberdeen, and his wife Frances. One of his sisters, Frances (1866–1956), and two of his brothers, Ian Forbes-Robertson (1859–1936), Norman Forbes-Robertson (1858–1932) also became actors, with another brother, Eric Forbes-Robertson (1865–1935), becoming a notable artist. Through his wife Gertrude Elliott, he was the brother-in-law of the actress Maxine Elliott, the uncle of Roy Harrod the economist, and was also the great-uncle of actress Meriel Forbes (granddaughter of his brother Norman), who married the actor Ralph Richardson.

He was educated at Charterhouse. Originally intending to become an artist, he trained for three years at the Royal Academy. He began a theatrical career, out of a desire to be self-supporting, when the dramatist William Gorman Wills, who had seen him in private theatricals, offered him a role in his play Mary Queen of Scots.

== Acting career ==
His many performances led him into, among other things, travel to the US, and work with Sir Henry Irving. He was hailed as one of the most individual and refined of English actors.

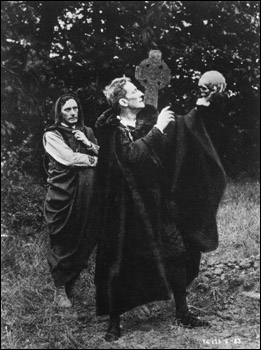
Hamlet at the grave site

Forbes-Robertson first came to prominence playing second leads to Henry Irving before making his mark in the role of Hamlet. One of his early successes was in W. S. Gilbert's Dan'l Druce, Blacksmith. In 1882, he starred with Lottie Venne and Marion Terry in G. W. Godfrey's comedy The Parvenu at the Court Theatre. George Bernard Shaw wrote the part of Caesar in Caesar and Cleopatra for him. Shaw stated:

I wrote Caesar and Cleopatra for Forbes-Robertson, because he is the classic actor of our day, and had a right to require such a service from me … Forbes-Robertson is the only actor I know who can find out the feeling of a speech from its cadence. His art meets the dramatist’s art directly, picking it up for completion and expression without explanations or imitations … Without him Caesar and Cleopatra would not have been written.

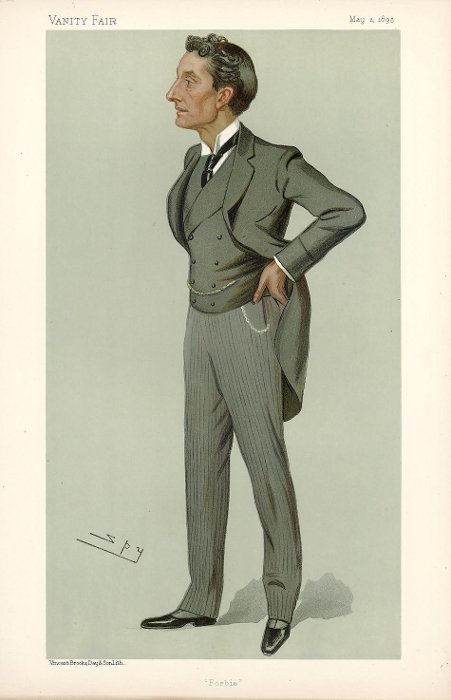
Johnston Forbes-Robertson, Vanity Fair, 1895

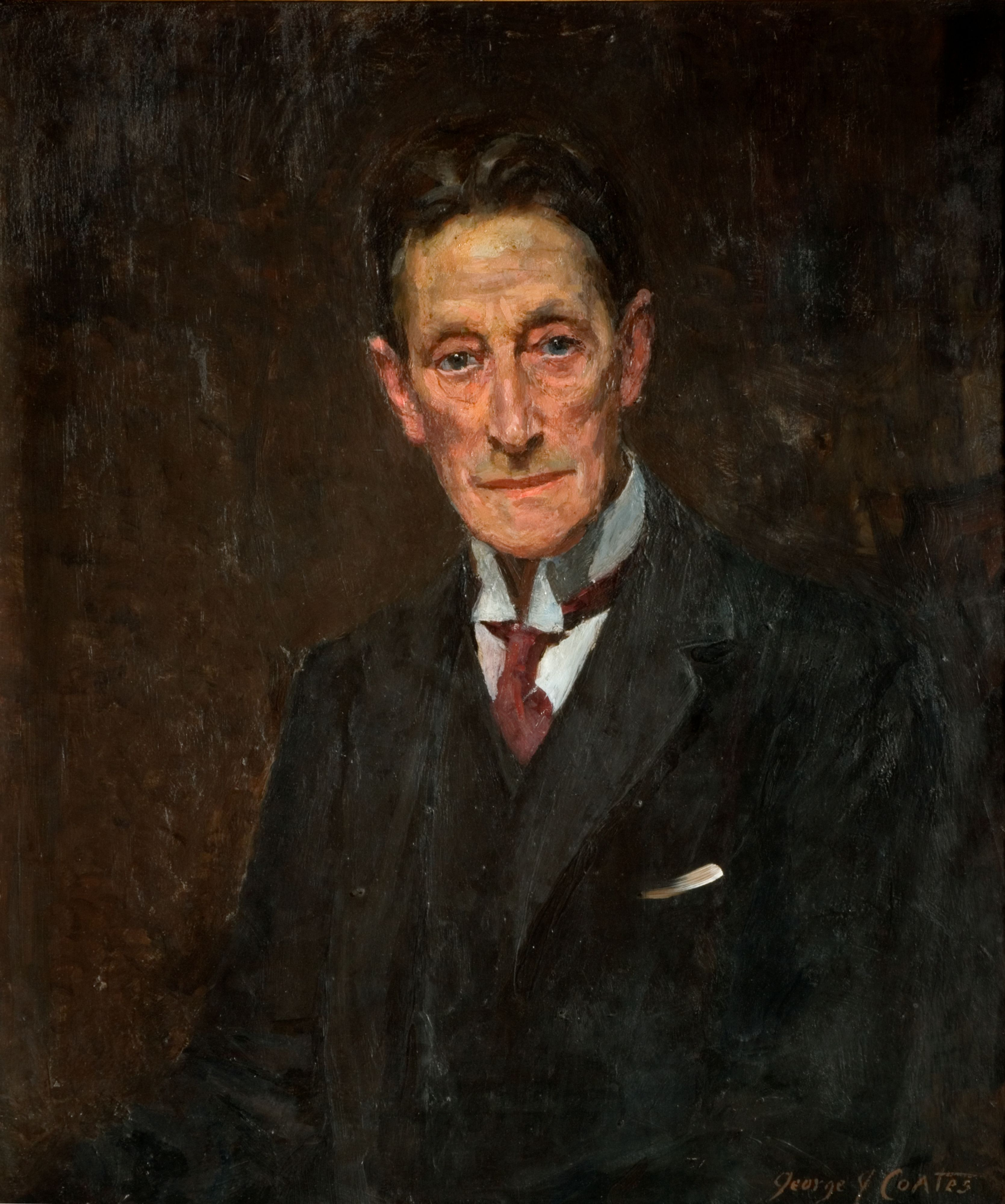
Portrait of Sir Johnston Forbes-Robertson, George James Coates, c.1900-1925.

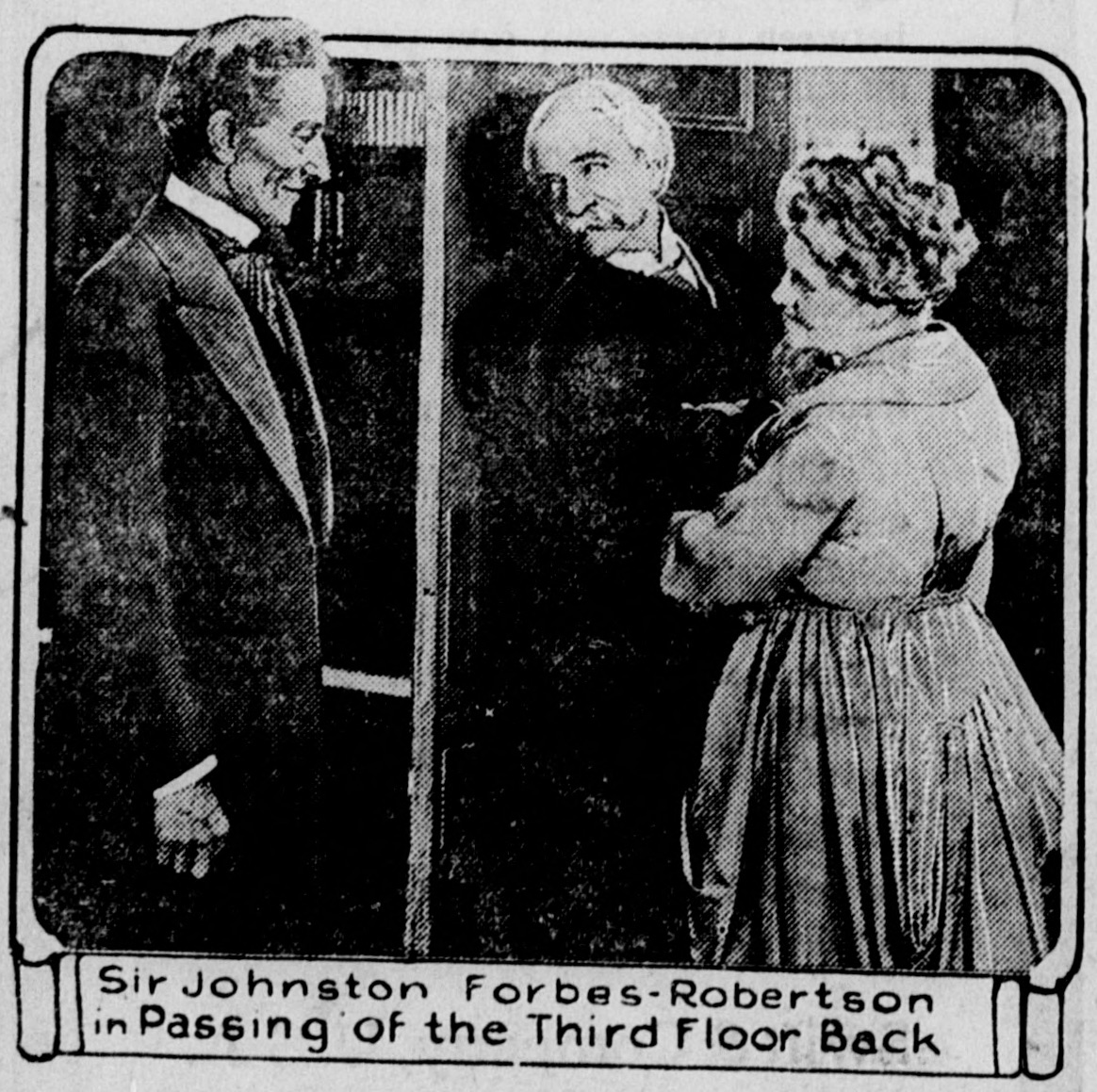
newspaper advert for the film version of The Passing of the Third Floor Back 1918.

Forbes-Robertson's other notable roles were Romeo, Othello, Leontes in The Winter's Tale, and the leading role in The Passing of the Third Floor Back; performed in the West End and on Broadway (filmed in 1916, released 1918). He did not play Hamlet until he was 44 years old, but after his success in the part he continued playing it until 1916, including a surviving silent film (1913). In a theatre review of Forbes-Robertson's performance in Hamlet published in The Saturday Review (2 October 1897) Bernard Shaw wrote:

Nothing half so charming has been seen by this generation. It will bear seeing again and again. … His intellect is the organ of his passion. His eternal self-criticism is alive and thrilling as it can possible be. … Mr. Forbes-Robertson’s own performance has a continuous charm, interest and variety, which are the result not only of his well-known grace and accomplishment as an actor, but of a genuine delight – the rarest thing on our stage – in Shakespeare’s art, and a natural familiarity with the plane of his imagination.

Forbes-Robertson was also a talented painter who did a portrait of his mentor Samuel Phelps that currently hangs in the Garrick Club in London. Forbes-Robertson acted in plays with the actress Mary Anderson in the 1880s. He fell in love with her and asked her hand in marriage. She turned him down kindly though they remained friends. Later he and the actress Mrs Patrick Campbell enjoyed a brief affair during the time she starred with him in a series of Shakespearean plays in the mid-1890s.

On 26 November 1908 he chaired the inaugural meeting of the Actresses' Franchise League at the Criterion Restaurant in Piccadilly Circus, London. The first president of the league was Dame Madge Kendal and his wife Gertrude Elliott became the second president a year later. Forbes-Robertson was a regular speaker at events in support of suffrage.

Johnston Forbes-Robertson was knighted in 1913 at the age of 60, at which point he retired briefly from acting.

He returned to the stage for his first farewell tour of the US in 1914–1915. It began in with a three-month run in New York, and then travelled the country using eight rail road freight cars to carry the sets, costumes and properties for eight shows; and two passenger cars for the actors and personnel. His last appearance was at the Sanders Theatre in Boston with a performance of Hamlet.

The second farewell tour followed; it travelled to 122 towns, beginning in Detroit in October 1915, with four plays. The tour travelled to Chicago, Indianapolis, St. Louis, Kansas City, Salt Lake City and San Francisco – where he learned of the birth of his fourth daughter, Diana. At this point they decided to reduce the itinerary to only three plays, by eliminating Caesar and Cleopatra from the repertoire. In his autobiography he describes how, on one early morning, the set, including the sphinx, was piled onto a beach and set on fire. The tour continued into Canada. His last performance as both Hamlet and as an actor, was in 1916 at the Sheldon Lecture Theatre of the University of Harvard, the stage of which had been made to replicate the stage of the Elizabethan Fortune Theatre especially for the Forbes-Robertson's performance.

His literary works include The Life and Life-Work of Samuel Phelps (actor and theatre manager) as well as his own autobiography A Player Under Three Reigns (1925).

== Marriage and family ==
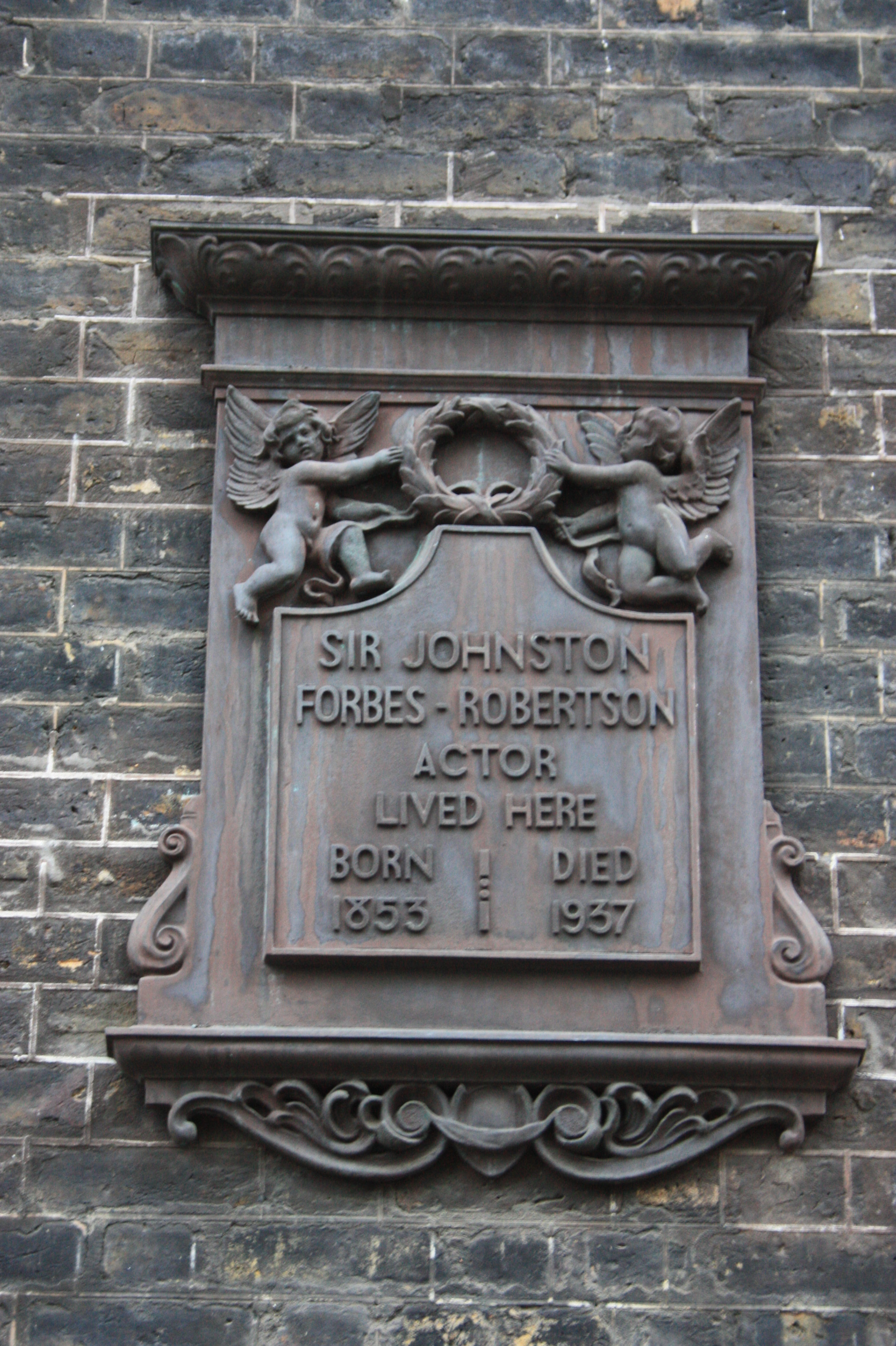
Memorial plaque, Bedford Square, London

In 1900, at age 47, he married the American-born actress Gertrude Elliott (sister of Maxine Elliott) with whom he had four daughters.

- Their first daughter was Maxine Forbes-Robertson known as 'Blossom', who married the aircraft designer F. G. Miles and became a director and designer of the Miles Aircraft company. She previously married Inigo Freeman-Thomas, 2nd Marquess of Willingdon, in 1924; they divorced in 1932.
- Their second daughter Jean Forbes-Robertson became an actress. Through Jean he is the grandfather of actress Joanna Van Gyseghem.
- Their third daughter was Chloe Forbes-Robertson (1909–1947), an artist.
- Diana Forbes-Robertson (1914–1988), their fourth daughter, was a writer who later wrote a biography of her aunt Maxine Elliott.

== Death and legacy ==
On 6 November 1937 he died at St. Margaret's Bay, near Dover, Kent; he was cremated at Golders Green Crematorium, London on 9 November. Memorial services were held at St. Martin-in-the-Fields, Westminster, London.

A statue of Forbes-Robertson by Brenda Putnam (1932) can be found at the Folger Shakespeare Library in Washington D.C.

== Partial filmography ==
- Hamlet (1913)
- Masks and Faces (1917)
- The Passing of the Third Floor Back (1918)
