= Norman Forbes-Robertson =

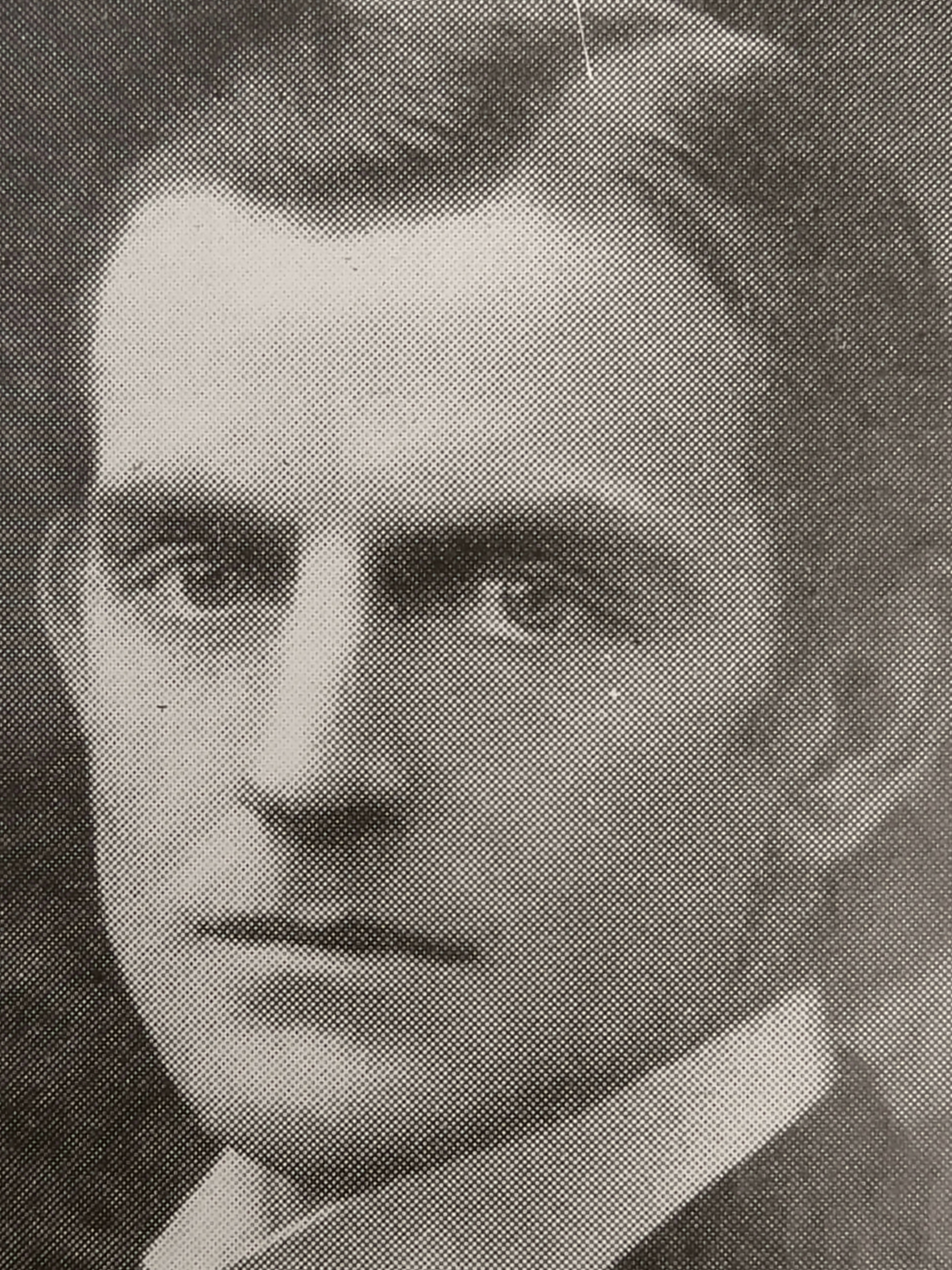
- Forbes-Robertson, in 1904
- Born: 24 September 1858
- Died: 28 September 1932 (aged 74); Exeter, Devon
- Occupation: Actor

Norman Forbes-Robertson (24 September 1858 – 28 September 1932), known professionally as Norman Forbes, was an English actor and art dealer. He was the brother of actor Johnston Forbes-Robertson and a friend of Ellen Terry, Oscar Wilde, Edward Elgar and Henry Irving. Together with Bram Stoker, he helped to organize Irving's funeral; a large body of letters connected with this event still exist.

== Biography ==
Forbes was the son of John Forbes-Robertson (1822–1903) and one of the 11 siblings of Johnston Forbes-Robertson. (Note: GRO index: Births Dec 1858 Robertson Norman Forbes Islington 1b 194)

He was educated at University College School, London and studied acting under Samuel Phelps. Forbes-Robertson was a prominent member of London's exclusive Garrick Club. According to "The History of the Tie", one afternoon in the 1920s, he wore a salmon-and-cucumber tie to lunch at the Garrick Club, joking that it was the official club tie. Thereafter it was adopted as such.

His first stage appearance was on 20 November 1875 when he played Sir Harry Guildford in Shakespeare's King Henry VIII at the Gaiety Theatre.

His final performance was as Sir Andrew Aguecheek in Twelfth Night at the New Theatre in 1932, a role for which he had become famous.

Forbes also had a career as an art dealer and in 1901 was credited with discovering the painting Christ in the House of Martha and Mary by Johannes Vermeer.

Forbes had an intimate friendship with Oscar Wilde. Their friendship, which began some time before May 1879, was described as intense but entirely platonic.

In the early 20th century, he owned and restored Stocks Mill in Wittersham, Kent. Forbes-Robertson was knocked down by a motor car in September 1932 and died in Exeter, Devon. He was an early motorist, employing his own chauffeur. He was the father of Norman, Olivia and Jill.
