= The Passing of the Third Floor Back =

The Passing of the Third Floor Back may refer to:

- The Passing of the Third Floor Back (play), 1908
- The Passing of the Third Floor Back (1918 film)
- The Passing of the Third Floor Back (1935 film)
