= Paul Kelver =

First US edition (1902, Dodd Mead)

Paul Kelver is a 1902 semi-autobiographical novel by Jerome K. Jerome (best known for Three Men in a Boat).

"Paul Kelver" by Jerome K. Jerome is a novel set and published in the early 20th century. The story follows the life of Paul Kelver, who, in a London caught between dreams and harsh reality, grapples with the challenges of his childhood and his family dynamics. From the outset, Paul reflects on his fate and upbringing, exploring themes such as identity, family, and the struggle against adversity. The opening of the novel establishes the narrative atmosphere as Paul recalls his childhood and the expectations of society. The novel illuminates Paul's relationship with his parents, particularly the contrast between his father's ambitions and the difficulties the family faces in a modest, often hostile environment. In this, as in much else, the novel draws on the author's own life story. The book opens with an evocative prologue depicting the old house that irresistibly draws Paul in and hints at a profound connection to his past. Through a humorous exploration of his birth, interspersed with tender and critical observations, the reader discovers the moral and existential questions that will shape Paul's path to adulthood. As themes such as fate, family, and self-discovery unfold, the opening lays the foundation for an exploration of the hero's character and its implications in the contemporary world.

Until the publication of Paul Kelver reviewers had frequently dismissed Jerome's writing as "colloquial" and "vulgar". Punch dubbed Jerome "'Arry J. 'Arry". But the public loved his writing, particularly in Idle Thoughts of an Idle Fellow (1886) and Three Men in a Boat (1889). His biographer Joseph Connolly comments that readers loved Jerome's work for the very reasons that the critics loathed it: "it was modern, vulgar, of the people, and written in the very way … in which people spoke".

By contrast, Paul Kelver was exceptionally well reviewed. The Times called it "a remarkably good book"; The Pall Mall Gazette said, "The book is really great. Everything is there – humour and pathos, sympathy and wisdom. One laughs, and cries, and approves. The book, in short, must admit him to the ranks of the great English novelists of the day". Several reviewers ranked the book with the novels of Charles Dickens. Jerome regarded it as his best work.

== Sources ==
- Connolly, Joseph (1982). Jerome K. Jerome: A Critical Biography. London: Orbis. ISBN 9780856133497.
