= Claude Houghton =

British novelist (1889–1961)

- Houghton, circa 1948
- Born: Claude Houghton Oldfield; May 1889; Sevenoaks, Kent, England
- Died: 10 February 1961 (aged 71); Eastbourne, East Sussex, England

Claude Houghton Oldfield (May 1889 – 10 February 1961), who published under the name Claude Houghton, was a British writer, principally of novels that have been characterised as "psychological romances, often embodying personal mysticism and a remote allegory".

== Life ==
Claude Houghton Oldfield was born in 1889 in Sevenoaks, Kent, the son of George Sargent Oldfield (a public secretary) and his wife Elizabeth Harriett née Thomas. After being schooled at Dulwich College, he trained as an accountant. During the First World War, he was rejected for combat service because of poor eyesight and served instead in the Admiralty. He married an actress, Dulcie Benson, in 1920, and the couple moved to a cottage in the Chilterns. He died in 1961 in Eastbourne, East Sussex.

== Writing and reception ==
Houghton's literary career began in the 1910s, with the publication of some of his poems in G. K. Chesterton's magazine The New Witness. He would later cite Gustave Flaubert, Honoré de Balzac, and William Blake as influences on his writing. Several of his novels contain fantastic elements, including the afterlife fantasy Julian Grant Loses His Way and the borderline science-fictional This Was Ivor Trent, about an author who has a vision of a future human being. Houghton stated that all his fiction was based on the belief that modern civilization would collapse "because it no longer believes it has a destiny".

Though he never achieved great popularity with the general public, Houghton's work was praised by such fellow writers as J. B. Priestley, Hugh Walpole, Clemence Dane, and Henry Miller. In 1935, Walpole wrote:

I believe Claude Houghton to be one of the most interesting and one of the most important novelists now writing in England. With none of his contemporaries can one compare him—his odd mixtures of reality and fantasy, his gifts of drama and philosophy, his unusual and significant and courageous themes, his natural aptitude for narrative, this last one of the rarest of gifts among novelists today.

In the same year a slim volume of Walpole's and Dane's commendations of Houghton's novels was published by Heinemann, Houghton's publisher.

Henry Miller was particularly partial to Houghton's Hudson Rejoins the Herd, of which he wrote: "What so startled me, in reading this book, was that it appeared to give a picture of my most intimate life during a certain crucial period. The outer circumstances were 'disguised,' but the inner ones were hallucinatingly real. I could not have done better myself." In 1995, some of the correspondence between Miller, Houghton, and the Chicago bookseller Ben Abramson was published in Writers Three: A Literary Exchange.

Houghton's novels were translated into French, German, and Czech, and President Tomáš Masaryk of Czechoslovakia was another admirer of his work.

Houghton's best-known novel is I Am Jonathan Scrivener, which Michael Dirda has called "a highly diverting, philosophical novel of considerable merit". It was published in the U.S. as the first of Simon & Schuster's Inner Sanctum mystery series, and it has been suggested (by the film's musical director, Bernard Herrmann) that the novel influenced Orson Welles's technique, in Citizen Kane, of presenting the personality of the eponymous character through the recollections of other characters. New editions of I Am Jonathan Scrivener and This Was Ivor Trent were published in 2013 by the U.S. publisher Valancourt Books, which also published new editions of Houghton's first novel, Neighbours, in 2014 and Julian Grant Loses His Way, A Hair Divides, and Chaos Is Come Again in 2015.

Both I Am Jonathan Scrivener and Birthmark were adapted as episodes of the U.S. television anthology series Westinghouse Studio One. The former, adapted by Brainerd Duffield and starring John Forsythe and Everett Sloane, was broadcast on 1 December 1952; the latter, broadcast on 4 May 1953 under the title "Birthright", was adapted by Emerson Crocker and starred Jackie Cooper, Everett Sloane, and Estelle Winwood.

== Selected works ==
=== Novels ===
- Neighbours (1926)
- The Riddle of Helena (1927)
- Crisis (1929)
- A Hair Divides (1930)
- I Am Jonathan Scrivener (1930)
- Chaos Is Come Again (1932)
- Julian Grant Loses His Way (1933)
- The Passing of the Third Floor Back (1935), based on the play by Jerome K. Jerome
- This Was Ivor Trent (1935)
- Christina (1936)
- Strangers (1938)
- Hudson Rejoins the Herd (1939)
- All Change, Humanity! (1942)
- Six Lives and a Book (1943)
- Passport to Paradise (1944)
- Transformation Scene (1946)
- The Quarrel (1948)
- Birthmark (1950)
- The Enigma of Conrad Stone (1952)
- At the End of a Road (1953)
- The Clock Ticks (1954)
- Some Rise by Sin (1956)
- More Lives Than One (1957)

=== Plays ===
- Judas: A Tragedy in Three Acts (1922)
- In the House of the High Priest (1923)

=== Poetry ===
- The Phantom Host (1917)
- The Tavern of Dreams (1919)
- Sonnets and Lyrics (1941)

=== Other ===
- The Kingdoms of the Spirit (1924), essays
- Three Fantastic Tales (1934), short stories: "The Man Who Hated Everybody", "The Madness of Christopher Curlew", and "The Strange Case of Mr. Anatole Pickering"
- The Beast (1936), short story published as a chapbook
