= Three Men in a Boat (1975 film) =

1975 British TV series

- DVD cover.
- Based on: Three Men in a Boat by Jerome K. Jerome
- Written by: Tom Stoppard
- Directed by: Stephen Frears
- Starring: Tim Curry; Michael Palin; Stephen Moore
- Narrated by: Tim Curry
- Music by: David Fanshawe
- Country of origin: United Kingdom
- Original language: English

Production
- Producer: Rosemary Hill
- Cinematography: Brian Tufano
- Editors: Ken Pearce; Robin Sales
- Running time: 64 minutes
- Production company: BBC

Original release
- Release: 31 December 1975

Three Men in a Boat is a 1975 BBC comedy film adapted by Tom Stoppard, directed by Stephen Frears and starring Tim Curry, Michael Palin, and Stephen Moore. It is based on the 1889 novel of the same name by Jerome K. Jerome.

Michael Palin appeared in this film just as he was establishing his post-Monty Python career, and the film has "glints of Python-like silliness throughout".

== Plot ==
The film is narrated in first-person by Curry playing Jerome. Although the film follows the book's plot faithfully, it ends with an epilogue about the real-world events that shaped it. The narrator talks about the book's original appearance in Home Chimes and the excision of the serious travelogue parts by the magazine's editor. He then goes on to relate that Carl Hentschel ('Harris') was accused of being a German during the First World War (he was actually a Pole), that George Wingrave ('George') went on to become a bank manager, and that he wrote the book after returning from his honeymoon.

== Cast ==
- Tim Curry as Jerome
- Michael Palin as Harris
- Stephen Moore as George
