= Stereotypes of Germans =

Real or imagined characteristics of the German people

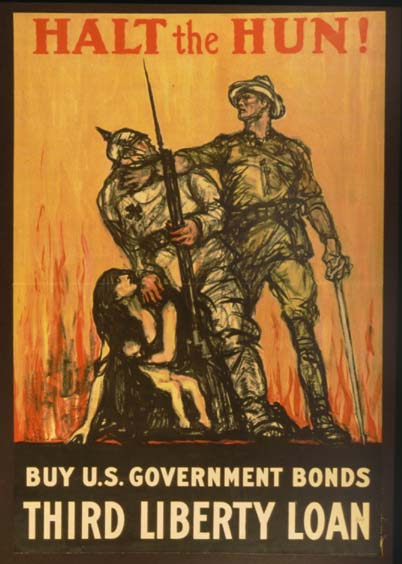
Germans were characterised as rapacious Huns during the First World War. This followed the Kaiser's Hun speech during the Boxer rebellion.

Stereotypes of Germans include real or imagined characteristics of the German people used by people who see the German people as a single and homogeneous group.

== Stereotypes among German people ==
There exist several internal stereotypes, such as those of Western Germans and Eastern Germans (Wessis and Ossis).

== Positive stereotypes ==
=== Extremely punctual people ===
According to the stereotype, in Germany, everything happens exactly as per schedule and Germans do not tolerate being late for any occasion and are proud of their punctuality. Part of the contribution to this was the similar image of the German work ethic perceived by American GIs in the postwar period: "Many West Germans are serious about their duties, keeping to their timetables, and do not enjoy many tea or coffee breaks". The German railroad system, which usually runs late, notoriously challenges this stereotype. The punctuality and discipline of the German people has been ridiculed by The Guardian.

=== Love of order ===
Attachment to order, bureaucracy, organisation and planning is a stereotype of German culture. Germany is perceived to have an abundance of rules (for example, copyright trolls often come from Germany) and Germans are generalized as enjoying obeying them. Jerome K. Jerome's novel Three Men on the Bummel makes fun of the perceived German craving for rules and passion in obeying them; the regimented life of German people is discussed in detail in this novel.

== Negative stereotypes ==
=== No small talk ===
Some think that every German is always straightforward, undiplomatic, and stoic. The perceived inability of the Germans to engage in small talk - as well as their unromantic nature - are discussed by foreigners. As far as Germans are concerned, 'A yes is a yes and a no is a no.'

=== Nazis ===
For Germany perpetrating the Holocaust and starting World War II, Germans are often stereotyped as Nazis. This stereotype, while now rare, persists to this day. After the war, the German people were often viewed with contempt because they were blamed by other Europeans for Nazi crimes. Germans visiting abroad, particularly in the 1950s and 1960s, attracted insults from locals, and from foreigners who may have lost their families or friends in the atrocities. Today in Europe and worldwide (particularly in countries that fought against the Axis), Germans may be scorned by elderly people who were alive to experience the atrocities committed by Nazi Germans or by veterans who had fought against the Nazis during World War II. This resulted in a feeling of controversy for many Germans, causing numerous discussions and rows among scholars and politicians in Post-War West Germany (for example, the "Historikerstreit" [historians' argument] in the 1980s) and after Reunification. Here, the discussion was mainly about the role that the unified Germany should play in the world and in Europe. Bernhard Schlink's novel The Reader concerns how post-war Germans dealt with the issue.

=== No sense of humour ===
Germans are perceived to be stiff and humourless. There are many popular culture references to perceived lack of humor in Germany, a notable example being the Funnybot episode of South Park. Edward T. Hall, an American sociologist and intercultural expert, has identified certain dimensions to explain cultural differences. He noted in particular that Germans tend to be task-oriented people, while the French, for example, seem to generally prefer personal relationships.

== Attitudes from specific countries ==
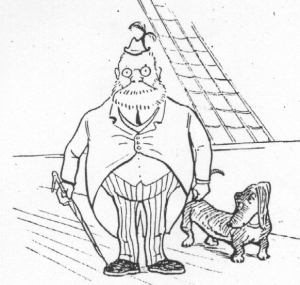
The character Federico Von Pilsener, created by Pedro Subercaseaux and featured in a Chilean comic strip in 1906 and 1907, is based on stereotypes of Germans.

British tabloids often portray Germans negatively.

In the course of the Greek government-debt crisis, Germany became a generalized object of critique as cruel and inflexible.

Despite the enormous influence of German Romanticism upon Russian literature and intellectual life, in modern Russia, the stereotype of outward seriousness of the German people is the basis for further stereotyping that they are cold and unromantic people. The kindness of the average German may not be observed by tourists who may only notice a reluctance to deal with complete strangers. Russians, on the other hand, also have a positive stereotype of Germans due to being serious and punctual, as well as being good entrepreneurs, thus serving as an inspiration for Russians to develop.

The United States has a mixed view on Germany. World War II movies in particular usually depict only German villains, rather than including Japanese or Italian characters. Since the 1930s to modern day, Hollywood still portrays and makes use of Nazis as villains in films such as Captain America: The First Avenger, The Dirty Dozen, Raiders of the Lost Ark, The Rocketeer, and Inglourious Basterds.

== See also ==
- Ethnocentrism
- Stereotype
- Stereotypes of Jews
- Stereotypes of Americans
- Stereotypes of Argentines
