= Woman in the Dark =

Woman in the Dark may refer to:

== Film ==
- Woman in the Dark (1934 film), an American crime drama
- Woman in the Dark (1952 film), an American crime drama

== Literature ==
- The Woman in the Dark (1895), a novel by F. W. Robinson
- Woman in the Dark (1933), a crime novella by Dashiell Hammett

== Television ==
- "Woman in the Dark", Holby City series 4, episode 9 (2001)
- "The Woman in the Dark", The First 48 season 23, episode 10 (2023)
