= The Passing of the Third Floor Back (play) =

Johnston Forbes-Robertson as the stranger

The Passing of the Third Floor Back is a 1908 play by Jerome K. Jerome, described by the author as "An Idle Fancy in a Prologue, a Play and an Epilogue". It depicts a mysterious stranger and his redemptive effect on the lives of the residents in a drab London boarding-house. It was tried out in Harrogate and modified for its transfer into the West End, opening there in September 1908. It divided the critics, but the public liked the work, and its star, the actor-manager Johnston Forbes-Robertson, revived it several times in Britain and the US. It has twice been adapted for the cinema.

== Background ==
The author Jerome K. Jerome was best known for his books – particularly The Idle Thoughts of an Idle Fellow (1886) and Three Men in a Boat (1889). But he had been an actor in his early days and retained a lifelong interest in the theatre and wrote plays from 1896 onwards. Most were comedies, but Jerome had a spiritual side, and The Passing of the Third Floor Back reflected this. He adapted the play from a short story of the same title published earlier in 1908 in a collection along with five other of his stories, "The Philosopher's Joke", "The Soul of Nicholas Snyders", "Mrs Korner Sins her Mercies", "The Cost of Kindness" and "The Love of Ulrich Nebendahl". The actor-manager Johnston Forbes-Robertson recalled in his memoirs (1925):

One day in the spring of 1908, while trying to decide what my repertoire should be for the autumn, since I had no new play even on the horizon, I got a telegram from Jerome K. Jerome saying he must read me a play. The next day he read The Passing of the Third Floor Back to my wife and me.

Forbes-Robertson and his wife (Gertrude Elliott) were amused by the brightness of the first act but were initially disconcerted by the static nature of the second – "a series of duologues". But they "gradually became deeply impressed with the elevating character of the theme", and agreed to stage the play. They did not think it would prove much of a draw for the public: Elliott's verdict was, "Some people will like it very much, but not enough people to make it a popular success".

== Premieres ==
The play was first seen at the Harrogate Opera House on 13 August 1908, and after some revision it opened at the St James's Theatre, London on 1 September. The cast remained unchanged:

- Joey Knight (retired bookmaker) – Ernest Hendrie
- Christopher Penny (painter) – H. Marsh Allen
- Major Tompkins (retired) – Ian Robertson
- Mrs Tompkins (his wife) – Kate Carlyon
- Vivian (his daughter) – Alice Crawford
- Jape Samuels (of the City) – Edward Sass
- Harry Larcomb (his jackal) – Wilfred Forster
- Miss Kite (unattached) – Haidée Wright
- Mrs Percival de Hooley (cousin to a baronet) – Kate Bishop
- Stasia (the slavey) (Note: The Oxford English Dictionary defines "slavey" as "A person, esp. a servant or attendant, who is hard worked, underpaid, or expected to perform all kinds of menial tasks.) – Gertrude Elliott
- Mrs Sharpe (the landlady) – Agnes Thomas
- The Third Floor Back – Johnston Forbes-Robertson

== Plot ==
Arrival of the stranger: Johnston Forbes-Robertson and Gertrude Elliott, centre, rear

A mysterious stranger arrives at a down-at-heel Bloomsbury boarding-house. He is referred to by the name of the room he takes, called the Third Floor Back; he is otherwise nameless and unknown. His work in the boarding-house is to bring back to all the residents – variously erring, wrangling, cheating or bullying – their lost selves, their departed youth and innocence. Most of the first act is taken up in introducing the various residents and depicting their petty meannesses and their limited outlook on life.

In the second act the stranger, a Messiah-like being, divines the possibilities for good which are latent in all around him. Thus, Vivian, who loves Christopher Penny, an artist, but is about to marry a retired bookmaker for his money realises she must not do so. Miss Kite, a "painted lady" is induced to leave off her paint and to resume her natural appearance. Major Tompkins and his wife stop urging Vivian to marry for money and become again an affectionate married couple, with consideration for their daughter's happiness. Jape Samuels, labelled "a rogue", desists from forcing bogus silver mines on gullible people, and Harry Larkcom, "a cad" adopts more artistic thoughts.

In the third act the reformed characters are seen in action. They think of one another more and of self less. No longer are rushes made for the most comfortable seats by the fire – they are offered with courtesy to the ladies; the major no longer steals macaroons from the dining room in his top hat. The boarding-house now has an air of general benevolence. Among the happy gathering the nameless visitor comes again. To each in turn he gives a blessing or a few parting words of advice, and, his work completed, he leaves, evidently to work similar miracles elsewhere.

== Revivals and adaptations ==
The play was revived in London in 1913, twice in 1917, and in 1928 and 1929, and in New York twice in 1910 and again in 1914. It has twice been adapted for the cinema, in 1918, starring Forbes-Robertson, and in 1935 with Conrad Veidt as the stranger. The BBC has broadcast several radio adaptations of the play, beginning in 1924; a 1939 adaptation starred Sir John Martin-Harvey as the stranger.

== Reception ==
The play divided the critics. The reviewer in The Bystander wrote, "The Passing of the Third Floor Back may be considered a sort of morality play which must be swallowed whole or altogether rejected. I think it will be accepted just as it is, and be considered a highly successful essay in a difficult branch of art". Max Beerbohm in The Saturday Review called it "vilely stupid" and the work of a "tenth-rate writer"; his opposite number in The Sketch wrote, "In the first place, let me state that The Passing of the Third-Floor Back is a play that nobody who is capable of appreciating a noble theme handled in a fine, sincere, and fearless way can afford to miss". The Daily Telegraph commented that Jerome "has boldly grappled with a grave and weighty theme, and his courage has been amply rewarded". Beerbohm admitted, "greater enthusiasm have I seldom seen in a theatre", and the play was exceedingly popular with audiences.

The initial run topped 200 performances; Forbes-Robertson revived the play many times and wrote that (despite his and his wife's doubts if the play would attract the public) it was, with the exception of Hamlet, the greatest financial success of his career. Before he took the production to New York he was uncertain that the piece would appeal to American audiences as much as to British, "but to my great relief it proved a sweeping success".

== Notes, references and sources ==
=== Sources ===
- Beerbohm, Max (1953). Around Theatres. London: Rupert Hart-Davis. OCLC 432708.
- Forbes-Robertson, Johnston (1925). A Player Under Three Reigns. London: T. Fisher Unwin. OCLC 1133041.
- Gaye, Freda, ed. (1967). Who's Who in the Theatre (fourteenth ed.). London: Sir Isaac Pitman and Sons. OCLC 5997224.
