= Kim Taplin =

English poet and writer (1943–2024)

Kim Taplin (1943–2024) was an English poet and non-fiction writer. She studied English at Somerville College, University of Oxford. Her death was announced on 10 April 2024. She was 80.

== Work ==
Taplin published several collections of poetry, and non-fiction works. The English Path was noted in the British Council's "Best books" in 1984, and Tongues in Trees: Studies in Literature and Ecology was reviewed in Poetry Review in 1990. Her 1993 work Three Women in a Boat retraces the journey of Jerome K. Jerome's Three Men in a Boat. She wrote several articles for Resurgence magazine.

Her poem "Trying for truth" was included in a 1991 collection Elected friends: poems for and about Edward Thomas.

== Publications ==
- The English Path (1979, Boydell Press ISBN 0851151175; 2nd ed 1999, Perry Green Press, ISBN 978-1902481098)
- Muniments (1987, Jackson's Arm, ISBN 094828207X )
- Tongues in Trees: Studies in literature and ecology (1989, Green Books, ISBN 978-1870098229)
- By the Harbour Wall (1990, Enitharmon Press, ISBN 1870612752)
- Three Women in a Boat (1993, Impact Books, ISBN 1874687137)
- Journeywork : writing from the Whitehill workshops (editor; 1997, ISBN 0953206203)
- For People with Bodies (1997, Flarestack, ISBN 1900397064)
- From Parched Creek (2001, Redbeck, ISBN 0946980837)
- Snow Buntings at Barton Point (2006, Sixties Press, ISBN 0952999471)
- Walking aloud : rambles in the Cherwell Valley (2008, Wychwood Press, ISBN 1902279336)
- Days off in Oxfordshire (2011, Wychwood Press, ISBN 9781902279435)
