= Beyond Midnight =

South African radio anthology series

Beyond Midnight was a South African radio horror anthology series that ran from 1968 to 1970 on Springbok Radio. The program "was a replacement series for SF'68. Michael McCabe served as producer, and adapted stories for both series. Unlike its sci-fi predecessor, Beyond Midnight served up stories with a supernatural bent." The show was sponsored by Biotex and featured the tagline "Just Soak, Just Soak, Just Soak in Biotex."

== Episodes ==
As the recordings of several episodes have been lost (especially towards the end of its run) some plots are not available.

No.	Title	Adapted by / based on story by	Original release date
1	"The Marble Knights"	E. Nesbit	November 1, 1968
A marble statue comes to life with terrifying results. Based on Edith Nesbit's story "Man-Size in Marble" (1887), versions of which were also produced for The Hall of Fantasy in 1947, CBS Radio Mystery Theater in 1977, and BBC Radio 7 in 2009; sometimes written 'Man-Sized' or 'Man Size'.
2	"The Paxton's House [aka House At Brickett Bottom]"	Amyas Northcote	November 8, 1968
Two sisters come across a narrow glen named Brickett Bottom. The two become infatuated with an old brick house and befriend the occupants. Things become strangely odd when the two sisters mention their encounter with locals who all say they've never heard of the old house or the occupants. Based on the Amyas Northcote story, 'Brickett Bottom' (1921) and referred to in other radio programs as 'House At Brickett Bottom' or 'Brickett Bottom' (on the program, CBS Radio Mystery Theater had an episode called 'The Phantom House').
3	"The Monkey's Paw"	W.W. Jacobs	November 15, 1968
A struggling family come across a desiccated monkey's paw that had a spell set upon it. Their desire to have their lives change for the better meet grim results. Based on the W.W. Jacobs story, 'The Monkey's Paw' (1902).
4	"The Phantom Coach"	Amelia B. Edwards	November 22, 1968
A lost hunter seeking refuge comes across a recluse living in a mansion, in hopes of finding his way back. Based on the Amelia B. Edwards story, 'The Phantom Coach' (1864).
5	"Spider-Phobia"	Elizabeth Walter	November 29, 1968
A magazine writer returning to his apartment comes across his greatest fear upon entering his suite; a spider. Based on the Elizabeth Walter story, 'The Spider' (1967) and referred to in other radio and television programs as 'The Spider' and 'A Fear of Spiders' (on the program, Night Gallery teleplay, 1971).
6	"The Late Mr. Elsham"	H.G. Wells	December 6, 1968
A young, ambitious medical student comes across a wealthy old man with a vast fortune who offers up his fortune to the young man. However, there are conditions attached to it. Based on the H.G. Wells story, 'The Story of the Late Mr. Elvesham' (1896) and referred to in other radio programs as 'The Story of the Late Mr. Elvesham'.
7	"Harry"	Rosemary Timperley	December 13, 1968
A young girl has an imaginary friend named Harry, who she claims is her brother. It slowly becomes evident that the imaginary friend is more than just a playmate. Based on the Rosemary Timperley story, 'Harry' (1955) and referred to in other radio programs as 'Harry, Such an Ordinary Name'.
8	"A Beautiful Viper"	Mary Elizabeth Braddon	December 20, 1968
A duel of honour pits two cousins against one another. Based on the Mary Elizabeth Braddon story, 'Eveline's Visitant' (1862) and referred to in other radio programs as 'The Mark of Shame' (on the program, The Hall of Fantasy).
9	"Smee"	A. M. Burrage	December 27, 1968
Friends at a party decide to play the game, 'smee'. However, there appears to be an uninvited extra player. Based on the A.M. Burrage story, 'Smee' (1929).
10	"Short Circuit"	Charles Eric Maine	January 3, 1969
A wealthy man has a technologically advanced house built for him to keep others out but the results prove to be tragic. Based on the Charles Eric Maine story, 'Short Circuit' (1966).
11	"No-Name Baby"	Ray Bradbury	January 10, 1969
A mother is convinced that her new born baby is trying to kill her. She hears him moving about the house and yet when she looks for him, he is located nestled in his crib. Based on the Ray Bradbury story, 'The Small Assassin' (1962).
12	"The Honeymooners [aka The Honeymoon]"	Ronald Duncan	January 17, 1969
Two soldiers, while on furlough, befriend each other on a train they are both riding. One of the soldiers, during the train ride, is off to marry a woman and the three ultimately spend the honeymoon together. Based on the Ronald Duncan story, 'Consanguinity' (1965) and referred to in other radio programs as 'The Honeymoon' or 'Consanguinity'.
13	"Lanceford House [aka The Green Vase]"	Dennis Roidt	January 24, 1969
A writer looking for solitude finds it in an old house. While there, he comes across a note advising him not to move a green vase that is located in the house. The author adheres to this instruction. However, the writer's visiting friend is made aware of the note, and he, unlike the writer, is a skeptic. Things go badly thereafter. Based on the Dennis Roidt story, 'The Green Vase' (1962).
14	"A Night In The Waxworks"	A.M. Burrage	January 31, 1969
An aspiring journalist sees an opportunity to be published by writing an account of his night at the Marriner's Waxworks that hosts several deceased murderers. Or are they all dead? Based on the A.M. Burrage story, 'A Night in the Murder's Den' (1931) and referred to in other radio programs as 'A Night in the Murder's Den', 'Waxworks' and 'The Waxworks' (on other radio program including The Price of Fear, Sleep No More and Suspense).
17	"Insect Man [aka Insects]"	Ray Bradbury	February 21, 1969
18	"All At Sea"	F. Marion Crawford	February 28, 1969
Also referred to as "The Thing in Cabin 105" or "Upper Berth". One of the ship's berths has a returning "visitor" who is not simply occupying the room but terrorizing the room's occupant.
19	"Eloise's Whereabouts [aka 40th Birthday]"	Michael McCabe	March 7, 1969
A man who has an impending 40th birthday is threatened by his wife's youth and wealth. He decides to make a few minor changes to his life with devastating results. Based on the Michael McCabe adaptation, 'Eloise's Whereabouts' (1969) and referred to in other programs as '40th Birthday', 'The Room' and as 'Three O'Clock' (Sleep No More and Suspense).
20	"The Dream"	Basil Cooper	March 14, 1969
A man is tormented by dreams that transport him to a different time and place, where janissaries are racing toward him, approaching closer and closer each night. Based on the Basil Copper story, "The Janissaries of Emilion" (1967).
21	"The House Was A Sphinx"	Henry Slesar	March 21, 1969
David Snowden is penniless manipulator who sees an opportunity to take advantage of a young heiress. After cleverly plotting her death as an apparent suicide, he is left a large run-down mansion with a mysterious fourth floor locked door. Based on the Henry Slesar story, 'The Right Kind of House' (1957) and referred to in other radio and television programs as 'Behind the Locked Door' (as a teleplay on the program, The Alfred Hitchcock Hour in 1964 and on the radio program, CBS Radio Mystery Theater in 1974 as 'The Locked Room').
22	"The Train"	Charles Dickens	March 28, 1969
A man describes his account of his meeting with a train signal-man and the strange tale imparted to him. Based on the Charles Dickens' story, 'The Signal-Man' (1866) and referred to in other radio programs as 'The Signal-Man' and 'Hello, Below There'.
23	"The Evil Face [aka Let Me See Your Face]"	A. M. Burrage	April 11, 1969
A mysterious woman keeps making appearances in a small French hotel. An inquisitive guest tries to make contact with her, despite being repeatedly discouraged by staff at the hotel that know her tragic history. Based on the A.M. Burrage story, 'One Who Saw' (1931) and referred to in other radio programs as 'Let Me See Your Face'.
24	"A True Ghost Story [aka Dear Ghost]"	Fielden Hughes	April 18, 1969
England, summer, 1921. Young man stays at a boarding house intending to write a novel. He begins to feel, even when no one else is there, that he is not alone in the cottage.
25	"The Wedding"	E. Nesbit	April 25, 1969
26	"Yarrow"	Sir Charles Lloyd Birkin	May 2, 1969
A young woman is raped and murder by the family chauffeur, George Yarrow, who gets away with it because of the lack of evidence. However, the family hires back Yarrow and with very horrific consequences. Based on the Charles Lloyd (later, Sir Charles Lloyd Birkin) story, 'An Eye for an Eye (1932) and referred to in the Beyond Midnight radio series as 'Yarrow'.
27	"Hobart [aka A Man Called Hobard]"	Elizabeth Bowen	May 9, 1969
28	"Little Happenthatch [aka Mrs. Smiff]"	Collin Brooks	May 23, 1969
A writer staying at his cousin's cottage is fascinated by his housekeeper, an attractive woman who casts no shadow. Based on Collin Brooks' story, "Mrs. Smiff" (1955).
29	"Borneo"	Oscar Cook	May 30, 1969
Two plantation owners become successful in Borneo until one leaves to get married and returns with his new bride. This development strains the friendship when the single partner engages in an affair with his partner's new spouse and when discovered, the vengeful plantation owner seeks a chilling revenge scheme on both his business partner and wife. Based on the Oscar Cook story, 'The Caterpillar' (1931) and referred to in the teleplay, Night Gallery, as 'The Caterpillar' (aired March 1st, 1972) while other radio programs have referred to it as 'Something on His Mind' and 'Boomerang'.
30	"The Yellow Room [aka The Red Room / The Room]"	H.G. Wells	June 6, 1969
31	"Arsenic"	Michael McCabe	June 13, 1969
32	"Sir Dominic's Bargain [aka The Man Who Lost His Soul]"	Joseph Sheridan Le Fanu	June 20, 1969
33	"The House [aka The Visits]"	Henry James	June 27, 1969
A student of divinity comes across a locked, abandoned house and witnesses an old man entering and exiting the house with a key. Intrigued, the young student takes it upon himself to watch the house and the old man. Based on the Henry James story, 'The Ghostly Rental' (1876) and referred to in other radio programs as 'The Visits'.
34	"Sammy"	Michael McCabe	July 4, 1969
35	"Vulture People [aka A Smile To Drive You Mad]"	Mary Elizabeth Counselman	July 11, 1969
In the Amazon, an injured expeditionary leader becomes jealous of his wife who seems taken with the charismatic Brazilian guide. While he waits for help, he has other intentions in order to get revenge on his wife who he sees as being unfaithful. Based on the Mary Elizabeth Counselman story, 'The Smiling Face' (1950) and also erroneously referred to in other radio programs as 'A Smile to Drive You Mad' and erroneously as 'The Paul Henry Expedition'.
36	"The Jokester"	Robert A. Arthur	July 18, 1969
A mean-spirited jokester goes too far with one of his jests when he preys upon a seemingly simple night watchman.
37	"Under The Hau Tree [aka Under The Hull Tree]"	Katherine Yates	July 25, 1969
A man at a Hawaiian resort tries to identify the couple in a photograph, but everyone at the resort who remember the couple cannot recall their names, as if their identities have been mysteriously erased. Based on the Katherine Merritte Yates story, "Under the Hau Tree" (1925).
38	"The Crystal Ball"	Sir Charles Lloyd Birkin	August 1, 1969
39	"Mrs. Taber's Killer"	Michael McCabe	August 8, 1969
40	"Fellini The Great [aka The Great Fellini]"	Henry Slesar	August 15, 1969
41	"The Happy Return"	William Hope Hodgson	August 22, 1969
A man has searched the world for his fiancée's lost ship, but when he finds it, it seems to be abandoned but in pristine condition, down to a calendar with today's date. He must find out what happened to the crew. Based on William Hope Hodgson's story, "The Habitants of Middle Islet" (1962).
42	"Take Your Partners"	Ronald Blythe	August 29, 1969
A young man recalls his meeting and dancing with a young, beautiful woman only to discover that not everything is as it seems. Based on the Ronald Blythe story, 'Take Your Partners' (1955).
43	"Terror Killed the Laughter [aka The Werewolf]"	Geoffrey Household	September 5, 1969
A couple on vacation in Zweibergen learn that there may be a werewolf in the forest killing local villagers, and the husband agrees to help hunt the beast. Based on Geoffrey Household's story, 'Taboo' (1939).
44	"Radiation"	Michael McCabe	September 19, 1969
45	"Turning To Marble [aka The Marble Room]"	Robert W. Chambers	September 26, 1969
A sculptor discovers a method to transform anything into marble, but he only reveals this to his best friend and the woman they both love. Based on Robert W. Chambers' story, "The Mask" (1895).
46	"A Man's Worth"	Henry Slesar	October 3, 1969
An up-and-coming executive is approached by a group that engages in 'anthropological psychiatry' (i.e. Voodoo), specifically willing the deaths of individuals who don't deserve to live. Based on Henry Slesar's story, "The Candidate" (1961).
47	"Something Haunts This House"	Michael McCabe	October 10, 1969
48	"White Revised"	Michael McCabe	October 17, 1969
49	"Storybook Man"	Michael McCabe	October 24, 1969
50	"Uninvited Face"	Michael Asquith	October 31, 1969
51	"The Cigarette Case"	Michael McCabe	November 7, 1969
52	"Mexican Mario"	Michael McCabe	November 14, 1969
53	"The Voice"	Michael McCabe	November 21, 1969
54	"Rendezvous"	Michael McCabe	November 28, 1969
55	"Watches By The Dead"	Michael McCabe	December 5, 1969
56	"The Manor House"	Michael McCabe	December 12, 1969
57	"A Time For Thunder [aka Cliffs of Bembridge]"	Michael McCabe	December 19, 1969
While visiting his friends' estate, a man sees an old painting of a beautiful woman. A thunderstorm then transports him back in time to meet her.
58	"The Door In The Wall"	Michael McCabe	December 26, 1969
59	"Sarah"	Michael McCabe	January 2, 1970
60	"Rupert Orange [aka What Happened To Rupert Orange]"	Vincent O'Sullivan	January 9, 1970
61	"The Thirteenth Elephant"	Michael McCabe	January 16, 1970
Two hunters are hired to thin a herd of elephants, and a witch doctor agrees to help them, but only if they kill no more than twelve.
62	"The Bonanza"	Michael McCabe	January 23, 1970
63	"The Visitors"	Michael McCabe	February 3, 1970
A plantation owner's evening is disrupted when people begin to arrive at his home as though they were the owners, and treat him as a confusing guest.
64	"The 56 G's"	Robert Bloch	February 20, 1970
An ex-con and his former cell-mate's widow try to figure out where he hid the money he stole. Based on Robert Bloch's story, "Water's Edge" (1964).
65	"The Picture"	Michael McCabe	February 27, 1970
A couple living and working in Africa experience a nightly "visitor" roaming among their trash bins. Becoming increasingly frustrated by being woke up on a frequent basis, the two devise a plan to take a picture in hopes of finding a solution to ridding themselves of the "visitor". However, the "visitor" is something more than what they bargained for.
66	"Impala"	Michael McCabe	March 6, 1970
A man flees to the Ethiopian highlands to escape the wrath of the god of all elephants. Based on the Michael McCabe adaptation, Impala (1970) and referred to in other radio programs as Nyala and Mkara (on the program, Nightfall).
67	"The Incomplete Corpse"	Michael McCabe	March 13, 1970
68	"The Marble Knights [aka Arthur's Return]"	Michael McCabe	March 20, 1970
69	"Mr. McGraw And His Victim [aka McGraw Shoots Stoney]"	Davis Grubb	April 10, 1970
70	"An Evil Memory Of Julia Wright"	Michael McCabe	April 17, 1970
71	"The Speciality Of The House"	Stanley Ellin	April 24, 1970
An exclusive resurant serves exotic meal. One man eager to see the kitchen finds out what's really on the menu.
