= Frederick William Robinson =

English novelist

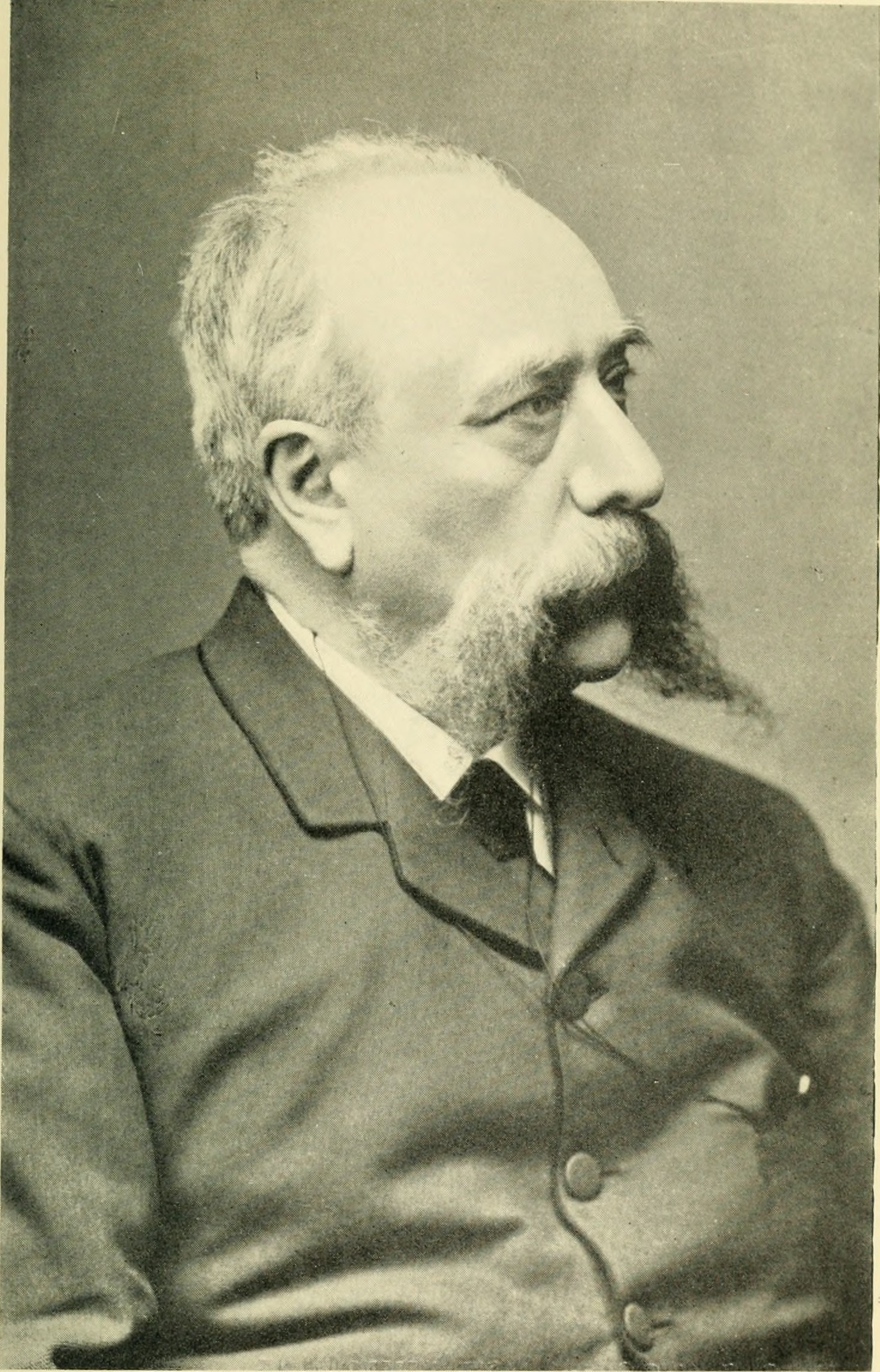
Frederick William Robinson

Frederick William Robinson (23 December 1830 – 6 December 1901) was an English novelist, magazine editor and drama critic.

== Life ==
Born in Spitalfields in 1830, Robinson was the second son of William Robinson of Lane, Brixton, who owned much house property in London. His mother's surname was St John.

After his education he acted for some time as his father's secretary, but he soon embarked upon a literary career, his first novel The House of Elmore, begun before he was eighteen, being published in 1855. It met with success and was followed by upwards of fifty other works of fiction. Grandmother's Money (1860) secured a wide vogue, which was maintained in an anonymous series of semi-religious novels: High Church (1860); No Church (1861); Church and Chapel (1863); Carry's Confession (1865); Beyond the Church (1866), and Christie's Faith (1867).

He was equally successful with two works of a different character: Female Life in Prison, by a Prison Matron (1862) and Memoirs of Jane Cameron, Female Convict (1863). These sketches and stories, based upon actual records, were so realistic in treatment as to be mistaken for literal history. Donations for prisoners reached Robinson, and his revelations led to improvement in the conditions of prison life. Robinson was also a pioneer in novels of low life, which included Owen, a Waif (1862), Mattie, a Stray (1864), and Milly's Hero (1865).

=== Later works ===
Among his later works of fiction are Anne Judge, Spinster (1867), No Man's Friend (1867) and The Courting of Mary Smith (1886). Poor Humanity (1868) was dramatised by the author and played with some success at the Surrey Theatre with William Creswick in the chief role, a returned convict.

Robinson's last complete novel, The Wrong that was done, appeared in 1892, and a volume of short stories, All they went through, in 1898. Robinson contributed to Family Herald, Cassell's Magazine and other periodicals, and for some years wrote dramatic criticisms for The Daily News, The Observer, and other papers. His novels appeared in the three-volume form, and with the extinction of that mode of publication his popularity waned.

Gerald le Grys Moorgate wrote in the Dictionary of National Biography in 1912: "A disciple of Defoe and Dickens, he wrote too rapidly to put such power as he possessed to the best purpose. Yet his work found constant readers in Dante Gabriel Rossetti and other men of note."

=== Home Chimes ===
In 1884 Robinson brought out a weekly penny magazine, called Home Chimes, which was heralded by a sonnet from Theodore Watts-Dunton, and contained contributions by Swinburne, Moy Thomas, and Phil Robinson. In February 1886 the paper was converted into a fourpenny monthly, and was carried on in that form until the end of 1893. Much early work by J. M. Barrie, Jerome K. Jerome, and Israel Zangwill, in whom the editor inspired great attachment, appeared in it. Robinson's friends of an older generation included, besides Swinburne and Watts-Dunton, Ford Madox Brown, Philip Bourke Marston and his father John Westland Marston, and Sir Henry Irving. Chess-playing was among his accomplishments.

He died at Elmore House, St James's Road, Brixton, on 6 December 1901, and was buried at West Norwood Cemetery. His wife, Rosalie Jane née Stephens, whom he married in 1853, survived him, with six sons and five daughters.
