= Three Men on the Bummel =

1900 novel by Jerome K. Jerome

- First edition
- Author: Jerome K. Jerome
- Language: English
- Genre: Comedy novel
- Publisher: J. W. Arrowsmith
- Publication date: 1900
- Publication place: United Kingdom
- Media type: Print (hardback & paperback)
- OCLC: 9315381
- Preceded by: Three Men in a Boat

Three Men on the Bummel (also known as Three Men on Wheels) is a humorous novel by Jerome K. Jerome. It was published in 1900, eleven years after his most famous work, Three Men in a Boat.

The sequel brings back the three companions who figured in Three Men in a Boat, this time on a bicycle tour through Germany. D. C. Browning's introduction to the 1957 Everyman's edition says "Like most sequels, it has been compared unfavourably with its parent story, but it was only a little less celebrated than Three Men in a Boat and was for long used as a school book in Germany." Jeremy Nicholas of the Jerome K. Jerome Society regards it as a "comic masterpiece" containing "set pieces" as funny or funnier than those in its predecessor, but, taken as a whole, not as satisfying due to the lack of as strong a unifying thread.

== The word 'Bummel' ==
D. C. Browning writes "The title must be puzzling to many readers, for 'bummel' will not be found in English dictionaries." It is a German word, as Jerome does not explain until the end of the book, and apart from his book, it has not received any widespread use in English. (The first American edition, published by Dodd Mead in 1900, was entitled Three Men on Wheels.)

One of the characters in the book asks, "how would you translate [bummel]," to which the narrator replies, in the very final paragraph of the book:

"A 'Bummel'," I explained, "I should describe as a journey, long or short, without an end; the only thing regulating it being the necessity of getting back within a given time to the point from which one started. Sometimes it is through busy streets, and sometimes through the fields and lanes; sometimes we can be spared for a few hours, and sometimes for a few days. But long or short, but here or there, our thoughts are ever on the running of the sand. We nod and smile to many as we pass; with some we stop and talk awhile; and with a few we walk a little way. We have been much interested, and often a little tired. But on the whole we have had a pleasant time, and are sorry when it's over."

The general style and manner of the book are similar to its predecessor. It is a series of humorous vignettes, each of which builds slowly, through accumulation of layer on layer of detail, through several pages. Jeremy Nicholas calls these "set pieces." Most of them concern bicycling, genial (if shallow) commentary on German culture from the point of view of a British tourist, or situation-comedy-like depictions of interpersonal interactions between the characters.

== Cycling ==
The novel was written near the end of the Victorian era bicycle craze, launched by the development of the two-wheeled safety bicycle. It depicts an era when bicycles had just become a familiar piece of middle-class recreational equipment. The references to brand competition, advertising, and enthusiasts' attitudes toward their equipment resonate with modern readers.

The novel invites comparison with H. G. Wells's 1896 humorous cycling novel, The Wheels of Chance.

Many of the comments on cycling are relevant—and funny—today. Those who have purchased ergonomic bicycle saddles, intended to relieve pressure on the perineal nerves, may not know that these are not a new invention:

I said "...There may be a better land where bicycle saddles are made out of rainbow, stuffed with cloud; in this world the simplest thing is to get used to something hard. There was that saddle you bought in Birmingham; it was divided in the middle, and looked like a pair of kidneys."

He said: "You mean that one constructed on anatomical principles."

"Very likely," I replied. "The box you bought it in had a picture on the cover, representing a sitting skeleton—or rather that part of a skeleton which does sit."

He said: "It was quite correct; it showed you the true position of the--"

I said: "We will not go into details; the picture always seemed to me indelicate."

== Germany ==
Jerome's comic stereotypes of Germany and the German character provide some picture of the country during the period of the German Empire, at least how it was popularly perceived in Britain.

Generally, the country is portrayed as clean and orderly, yet heavily policed, with the authorities strictly enforcing even the most trivial of a vast number of laws and regulations (this causes the three men to frequently be in minor trouble with the law). The German people are described as amiable, unselfish, sincere, kind and egalitarian; yet they are also placid and obedient, eager to obey those in authority.

"The German citizen is a soldier, and the policeman is his officer. The policeman directs him where in the street to walk, and how fast to walk. At the end of each bridge stands a policeman to tell the German how to cross it. Were there no policeman there, he would probably sit down and wait till the river had passed by. At the railway station the policeman locks him up in the waiting-room, where he can do no harm to himself. When the proper time arrives, he fetches him out and hands him over to the guard of the train, who is only a policeman in another uniform. The guard tells him where to sit in the train, and when to get out, and sees that he does get out. In Germany you take no responsibility upon yourself whatever. Everything is done for you, and done well."

— Chapter XIV

Jerome comments that it would be consistent with the German character for a criminal condemned to death to obediently hang himself after being told to do so.

While Jerome admires German school education, he is less complimentary about universities. The Englishmen spend some time in the company of students; Jerome describes the German Student Corps and their customs the Kneipe, an organised beer party, and the Mensur, or Academic fencing. The mensur sword duels are described at length, with little humour, and with Jerome expressing extreme disapproval for the tradition.

"As the object of each student is to go away from the University bearing as many scars as possible... The real victor is he who comes out with the greatest number of wounds; he who then, stitched and patched almost to unrecognition as a human being, can promenade for the next month, the envy of the German youth, the admiration of the German maiden. He who obtains only a few unimportant wounds retires sulky and disappointed....These young German gentlemen could obtain all the results of which they are so proud by teasing a wild cat! To join a society for the mere purpose of getting yourself hacked about reduces a man to the intellectual level of a dancing Dervish."

— Chapter XIII

Jerome would have been aware of Mark Twain's humorous travelogue, A Tramp Abroad (1880), based on a walking tour through similar parts of Germany, with extensive comments on the language and culture. Three Men on the Bummel follows in this vein. At least one of Jerome's remarks, however, may be seen as prescient:

"Hitherto, the German has had the blessed fortune to be exceptionally well governed; if this continues, it will go well with him. When his troubles will begin will be when by any chance something goes wrong with the governing machine."

— Chapter XIV

== Comparison with Three Men in a Boat ==
Jeremy Nicholas says that the book is "unfairly chastised as being an ineffectual afterthought" to Three Men in a Boat, and that "the set pieces (the boot shop, Harris and his wife on the tandem, Harris confronting the hose-pipe, the animal riot in the hill-top restaurant) are as polished and funny (funnier, some would say) as anything in the earlier book." His analysis is that

The trump card that Bummel lacks, and which makes Three Men in a Boat what it is, is the River Thames. ... It provides the framework for Jerome's discursive narrative. He can stray from the present adventure as much as he likes ... but the river holds the whole thing together and gives the book its satisfying unity. The best television situation comedies rely on this same device, a world with clearly-defined parameters. A ramble through Germany and the Black Forest does not provide that.

== Adaptations ==
Hugh Laurie read the book as a Book at Bedtime for the BBC in 2001.

== See also ==
- Stereotypes of Germans

== Notes ==
1. D. C. Browning, 1957; introduction to Three Men and a Boat and Three Men on the Bummel; Everyman; J. M. Dent and Sons
2. Jeremy Nicholas: Three Men in a Boat and on the Bummel—The story behind Jerome's two comic masterpieces
3. D. C. Browning, op. cit.
4. American Heritage, 4th edition, does not have it. Webster's Third New International Dictionary, Unabridged. Merriam-Webster, 2002 does not have it in Jerome's sense; it defines "bummel" as "chiefly Scotland, bumble," which in turn is defined as a humming sound, buzz, or rumble.

Both The Chambers Dictionary and the New Shorter Oxford English Dictionary do list 'bummel' in precisely Jerome's sense (a stroll or leisurely journey). Both also give the German Bummel (noun) or bummeln (verb) as the origin of the word 'bum' in all its chiefly American senses. Chambers does have the Scottish variant of 'bumble' (as in bumblebee), but spells it 'bummle'. Bummel (German) : No preset destination or goal. Closest English equivalent verb 'aimless loafing'

1. (American edition entitled "Three Men on Wheels") Jerome K(lapka) Jerome, Contemporary Authors Online, Gale, 2005
2. Jeremy Nicholas, op. cit.
3. In the children's book Fungus the Bogeyman by Raymond Briggs (1977), the saddle of Fungus's bicycle is called a bummel, and is partly responsible for the vehicle's propulsion.
