= St Eanswith's Church, Brenzett =

Church of St Eanswith, Brenzett
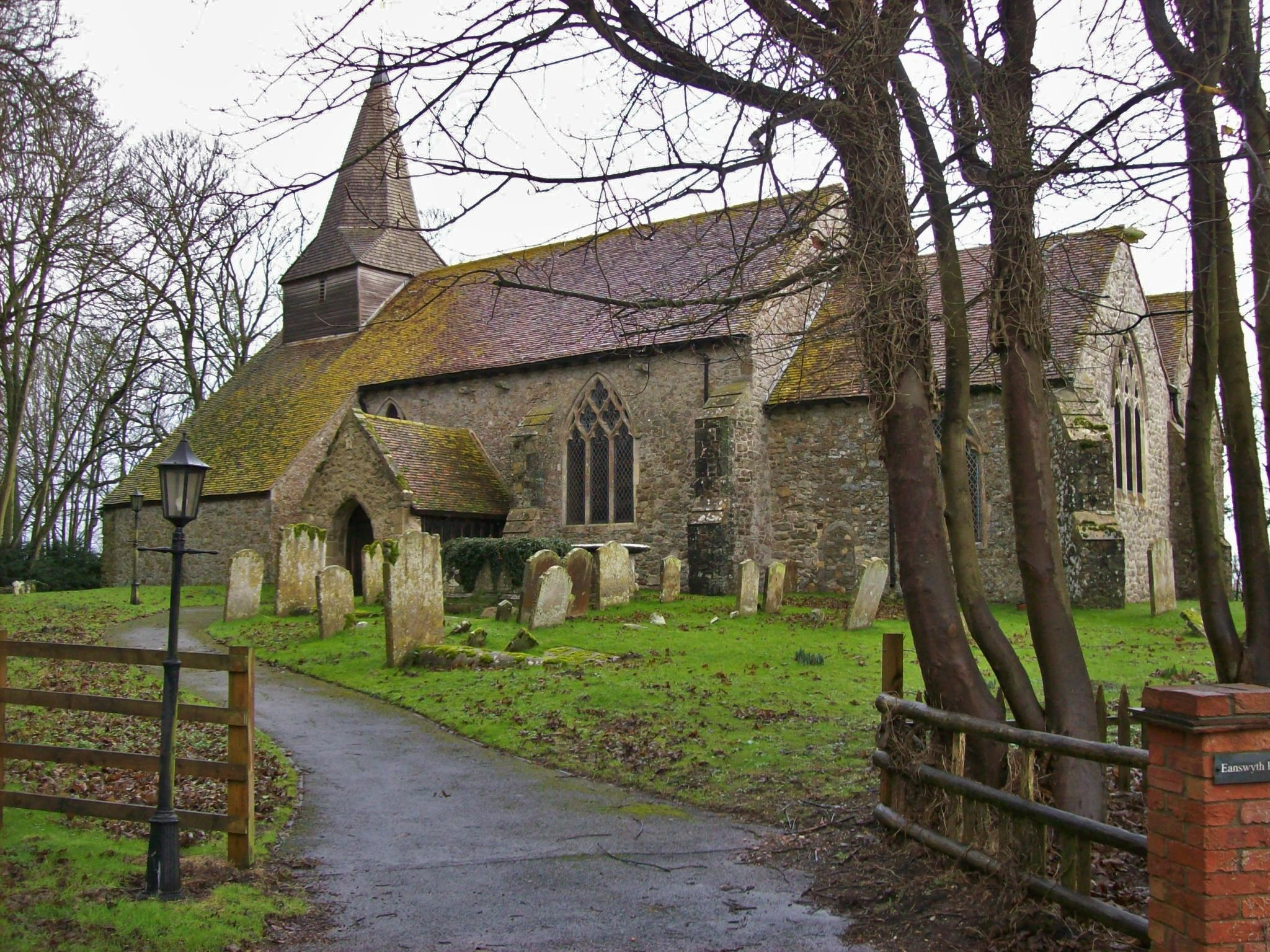
- Church of St Eanswith, Brenzett
- 51°0.8447′N 0°51.4209′E
- OS grid reference: TR 005 277
- Location: Brenzett
- Country: England
- Denomination: Church of England

History
- Dedication: Saint Eanswith

Architecture
- Heritage designation: Grade II*
- Designated: 9 June 1959
- Style: Early English Period

Administration
- Diocese: Diocese of Canterbury
- Deanery: Romney Deanery

St Eanswith's Church is a Grade II* listed Anglican church in the village of Brenzett, Kent, about 7 miles (11 km) north-east of Rye, East Sussex. A church was originally built on this site in the 7th century; the present building dates from the 12th century and has later modifications.

== Saint Eanswith ==
The church is dedicated to Saint Eanswith; she was an Anglo-Saxon princess, a granddaughter of king Æthelberht of Kent (who was converted to Christianity by Augustine of Canterbury), and daughter of king Eadbald of Kent who reigned from 616 to 640. She was born about 630, and it is believed that she was the abbess of a nunnery at Folkestone.

== Medieval church ==
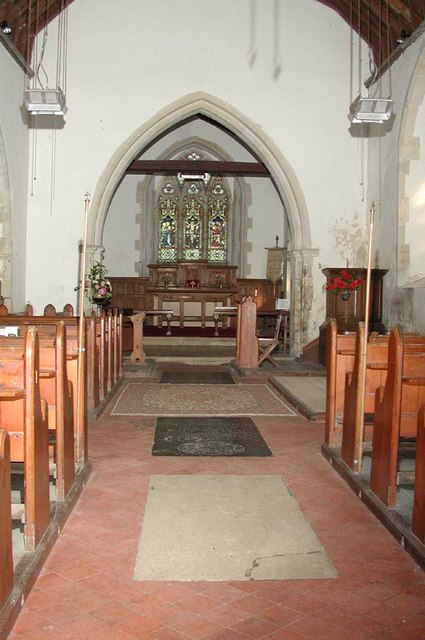
Interior, looking east

The oldest parts of the church, the nave and chancel, date from the 12th century, when the original Saxon church was replaced. There were extensions in subsequent years: the north chapel and north aisle was built in the 13th century; the nave was extended to the west in the 14th century.

A small spire, which has wood shingles, was built in the 14th century; to support it, a wooden frame was built, and buttresses built outside.

== Later additions ==
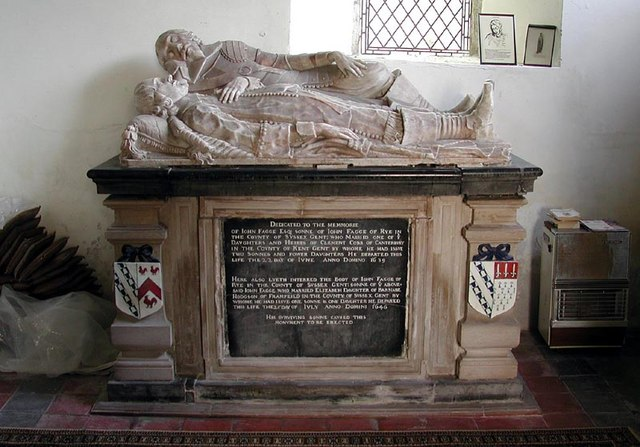
Tomb chest of John Fagge (died 1639) and his son, in the north chapel

There are three bells: a tenor bell of 1420, a treble by John Wilnar in 1630, and a middle bell by Thomas Palmar in 1699.

There was some restoration of the church in the 19th century, and the east window by Lavers, Barraud and Westlake was installed in 1874. The chancel was largely rebuilt in 1902.

In the north chapel is a monument to John Fagge, who died in 1639, and his son John, who died in 1646. This monument inspired E. Nesbit's 1887 short story "Man-Size in Marble".
