= Woman of Stone =

2024 British television ghost story

- Based on: "Man-Size in Marble" by E. Nesbitt
- Written by: Mark Gatiss
- Directed by: Mark Gatiss
- Starring: Éanna Hardwicke; Phoebe Horn; Monica Dolan; Celia Imrie; Mawaan Rizwan

Production
- Producer: Isibéal Ballance
- Running time: 30 minutes

Original release
- Release: 24 December 2024

Related
- A Ghost Story for Christmas

Woman of Stone is a short film which is part of the British supernatural anthology series A Ghost Story for Christmas. Produced by Isibéal Ballance and written and directed by Mark Gatiss, it is an adaptation of E. Nesbit's short story "Man-Size in Marble".

== Synopsis ==
A couple receive a warning from their superstitious housekeeper.

== Cast ==
- Éanna Hardwicke as Jack Lorimer
- Phoebe Horn as Laura Lorimer
- Celia Imrie as Edith Nesbit
- Monica Dolan as Mrs Dorman
- Mawaan Rizwan as Dr. Zubin
- Ryan Ellsworth as Knight
- Ashley Jarvis as Knight

== Production ==
Mark Gatiss wrote and directed the film, which is his seventh A Ghost Story for Christmas special. It is an adaptation of E Nesbit's short story "Man-Size in Marble" which Gatiss described as "the very first ghost story I ever read". It is produced by Adorable Media for BBC Two and BBC iPlayer. Isibéal Ballance produces for Adorable Media.

The cast includes Éanna Hardwicke, Celia Imrie, Monica Dolan, Mawaan Rizwan and Phoebe Horn.

During the film, the character of Jack exclaims "Imperial!" and "Capitol!", both phrases used by the character of Cavor, played by Lionel Jeffries in First Men in the Moon, a role writer Gatiss later played in his 2010 BBC adaptation, The First Men in the Moon. Jeffries himself directed the 1970 film of Nesbit's The Railway Children, adding an extra meaning to the reference.

== Broadcast ==
A special preview screening of the film was held at BFI Southbank in December 2024 prior to its broadcast. It was broadcast on BBC Two on 24 December 2024.

== Reception ==
Joel Golby in The Guardian praised the "exemplary casting" and the plotting by Gatiss whose "clever tweaks make the already good story even better".
