= The Passing of the Third Floor Back (1935 film) =

- Film poster
- Directed by: Berthold Viertel
- Written by: Michael Hogan (writer); Jerome K. Jerome (play and short story); Alma Reville (writer)
- Starring: Conrad Veidt; Anna Lee; Rene Ray; Frank Cellier
- Cinematography: Curt Courant
- Edited by: Derek N. Twist
- Music by: Hubert Bath
- Distributed by: Gaumont
- Release date: 15 December 1935
- Running time: 90 minutes
- Country: United Kingdom
- Language: English

The Passing of the Third Floor Back is a 1935 British drama film directed by Berthold Viertel and starring Conrad Veidt, Anna Lee, Rene Ray and Frank Cellier. The film is based on a 1908 play by Jerome K. Jerome and depicts the various small-minded inhabitants of a building and ways they are affected by the arrival of a stranger who works to redeem them. The work had previously been adapted into a 1918 film version by Herbert Brenon.

== Plot ==
The film focuses on a run-down boarding house in London, home to assorted residents. Many of them cling precariously to their social positions with only one figure, the wealthy self-made businessman Mr Wright, being truly successful. The house is owned by the grasping Mrs Sharpe, who mistreats the maid, Stasia, a rehabilitated juvenile delinquent. The members of the household are miserable and openly sneering and rude towards each other, the one exception being the respect shown by all to the powerful Mr Wright. In the case of one couple, Major Tomkin and his wife, this involves pressuring their daughter, Vivian, to marry Wright in spite of her obvious horror at the idea.

The house's familiar routine is thrown off-balance when a mysterious foreigner (secretly an angel), takes up residence. In time, he earns the respect of the others in the house, especially Stasia. He takes a room on the "third floor back" and joins the residents for a dinner being held in celebration of the engagement between Wright and Vivian. It becomes evident that she does not want to marry Wright because she is in love with one of the other lodgers, and she storms out of the room. The desperate Major later tries to convince Wright that it is a misunderstanding and that the engagement is still on. He and his wife are terrified by the loss of security if the marriage is broken off.

The stranger observes the meanness shown by the other members of the house, and gently encourages them to treat each other better and to pursue their dreams rather than live in fear about their precarious social positions. This gradually begins to work, as some of the house's residents are convinced by his charisma. On a bank holiday, the stranger announces that he will treat them all to a boat trip to Margate, surprising the more snobbish residents by insisting that the servants, including Stasia, join them. Despite the initial awkwardness, the outing soon begins to go well. When Stasia falls in the River Thames, one of the women jumps in to save her life. Once Stasia is rescued, she is looked after by the Tomkins, who treat her as though she were their daughter. They also begin to regret their bullying of their own daughter into a marriage with Wright. During the trip, various members of the household begin to enjoy themselves and treat each other with more respect.

Wright resents this change, and he spitefully begins to wreck the stranger's attempts to reform the guests. The next day, the inhabitants return to their previous unhappy existence and resume fighting. Wright taunts the stranger by demonstrating how easily he has corrupted them through the simple power of his money. The stranger tries to convince Wright that he, too, should try to seek a better and happier life, but Wright rejects this. Their dispute develops into a moral battle between the stranger's goodness and Wright's evil.

== Cast ==
- Conrad Veidt as The Stranger
- Anna Lee as Vivian
- Rene Ray as 'Stasia
- Frank Cellier as Wright
- John Turnbull as Major Tomkins
- Cathleen Nesbitt as Mrs Tomkins
- Ronald Ward as Chris Penny
- Beatrix Lehmann as Miss Kite
- Jack Livesey as Mr Larkcom
- Sara Allgood as Mrs de Hooley
- Mary Clare as Mrs Sharpe
- Barbara Everest as Cook
- Alexander Sarner as The gramophone man
- James Knight as The police inspector

== Production ==
The film was the second British film of the Austrian director Berthold Viertel, who had left Germany in the late 1920s and had directed Little Friend (1934). Little Friend was considered sufficiently successful for him to be awarded a three-film contract with Gaumont, the first of which was to be an adaptation of Jerome's The Passing of the Third Floor Back after a planned biopic of Lord Byron was abandoned. Viertel saw problems with transferring it to the screen but was interested in depicting the psychological motivation of the various characters. Shooting was scheduled to last around six weeks and was to use a very limited number of sets with only one scene, the visit to Margate, shot outside the studio. Viertel studied the recently released film The Barretts of Wimpole Street, which was similarly set in the confined location of a house.

Viertel made only one further film, Rhodes of Africa (1936).

== Reception ==
Writing for The Spectator in 1935, Graham Greene praised the film for having toned down "the pious note" of the original play, and noted that to his surprise he had enjoyed it. He criticized director Viertel, however, for the film's difficulty in portraying the moments of "sweetness and light" with equal truth and realism.

The film was voted the fourth best British movie of 1936.

== See also ==
- List of films about angels

== Bibliography ==
- Richards, Jeffrey (ed.) The Unknown 1930s: An Alternative History of the British Cinema, 1929–1939. I.B. Tauris, 1998.
