= Man-Size in Marble =

- Short story by E. Nesbit

Text available at Wikisource
- Language: English
- Genre: Short story

Publication
- Published in: Home Chimes
- Publication date: December 1887
- Publication place: England
- Media type: Print, magazine

"Man-Size in Marble" is a short story by the English writer E. Nesbit, first published in Home Chimes in December 1887. Set in the English village of Brenzett, the story concerns a grim legend concerning marble statues. Widely anthologised, it has been adapted several times, including the 2024 short film Woman of Stone.

== Plot summary ==
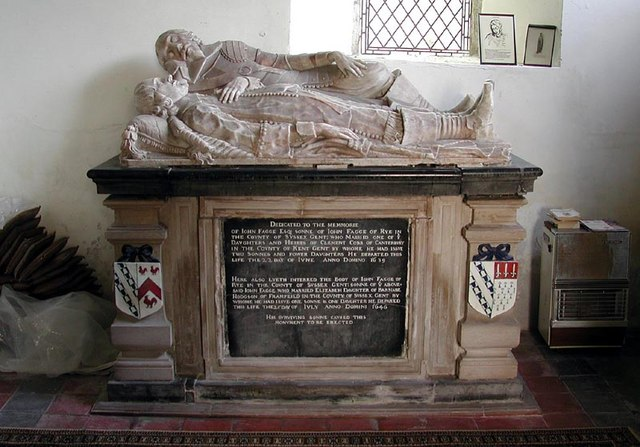
The tomb chest of John Fagge and his son in the north chapel of St Eanswith's Church, Brenzett, which inspired Nesbit to write the story.

Newly-weds Jack and Laura move to a cottage on the outskirts of the English village of Brenzett. Nearby the cottage is a church which contains two life-sized marble sculptures of knights in plate armour, who are reputedly locally to have been "fierce and wicked men, marauders by land and sea, who had been the scourge of their time" and whose house stood on the present site of the cottage.

After three months have passed, Jack returns home from a visit to his neighbour, the Irish doctor Kelly, to find Laura crying due to Mrs. Dorman, their cook and housekeeper, having advised she must leave at the end of the month. After Jack quizzes Mrs. Dorman on why she intends to depart, she reveals a local legend that at eleven o'clock on All Saints' Eve each year, the two knights rise from their slabs and walk to the site of their former home. Mrs. Dorman advises Jack to lock the cottage's door early on All Saint's Eve, and to "make the cross-sign over the doorstep and on the windows". Jack decides not to pass the legend on to Laura.

On All Saints' Eve, Laura is uneasy, referring to her previously having had "presentiments of evil". At half-past ten, Jack decides to smoke his pipe outside, insisting Laura remain at home due to being tired. Walking outside, Jack hears the clock strike eleven; looking through the cottage window, he sees Laura lying in her chair by the fire. Deciding to walk to the church, Jack hears a rustling in the woods, which he ascribes to poachers. He is surprised to find the church door open, and shocked to find the stone slabs bare.

Rushing back to the cottage, Jack encounters Kelly, who insists that he was "dreaming or drinking" and persuades Jack to return to the church. Seeing the statues back on the slabs, Jack believes he must have been mistaken. Examining the statues, Kelly observes that the hand of one statue is damaged. Returning to the cottage, Jack and Kelly find the front door and parlour door standing open. They find Laura's body by the window, with a marble finger clenched in her hand.

== Publication ==
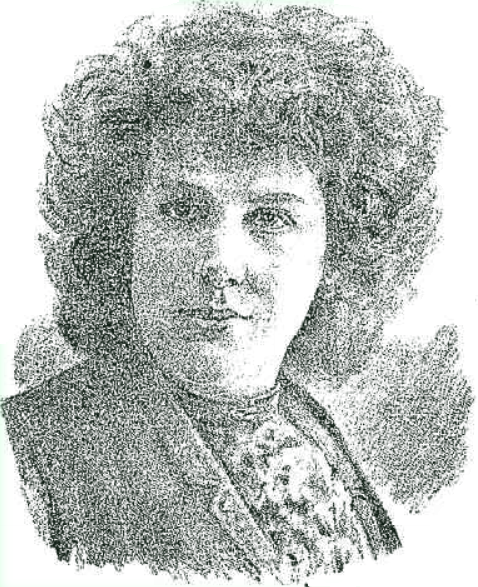
E. Nesbit in 1889.

"Man-Size in Marble" was first published in the London magazine Home Chimes in December 1887. It was Nesbit's first published work of fiction. It was collected in Nesbit's books Grim Tales (1893) and Fear (1910), as well as several later collections. It has since been anthologised many times. Writing for the CEA Critic in 2011, Terry W. Thompson stated that "Man-Size in Marble" is Nesbit's "most frequently anthologized work".

The story was inspired by the tomb of John Fagge and his son in St Eanswith's Church, Brenzett.

== Reception and interpretation ==
Reviewing Grim Tales for The Academy in 1893, James Stanley Little described "Man-Size in Marble" as "perhaps too reminiscence of Prosper Mérimée's more daring effort" (the 1837 story "La Vénus d'Ille)". Reviewing Grim Tales in 1893, The Athenæum and Literary Chronicle described "Man-Size in Marble" as the best tale in the collection, stating that it "...at one point does succeed in producing a creepy feeling of horror".

Writing for the Times Literary Supplement in 2024, Catherine Taylor stated that that "Man-Size in Marble" "...is often praised as one of [Nesbit's] finest; and, though the tale of two ancient knights in armour hopping off their church tombs every Halloween is creaky and predictable, the title itself is splendid and provides an intriguing companion to the later (and less well-known) story 'The Marble Child'..."

Writing in 2014, Nick Freeman offered "Man-Size in Marble" as an example of "short, startling and often horrific tales that could be read at a sitting or indeed, read aloud" that emerged in the late-1880s. Freeman described Laura's death as "strongly symbolic of rape", and noted the story as an example of Nesbit casting "a sceptical eye on men's marital behaviour and on their faith in rationalism". Writing in 2013, Freeman described the story as "imbued with radical political energy that remains unusual in Gothic fiction". Writing in 2008, Freeman described the story as "...both a successful Gothic chiller and a more politicized investigation of the plight of the artistically ambitious New Woman under patriarchy."

Writing in 2008, Jess Nevins described "Man-Size in Marble" as "a nasty little conte cruel", and as "adequately told, with a few nicely turned phrases" with "a smooth 1890s feel to it", and as being "a good deal more brisk and readable than earlier horror stories".

Writing in 2018, Andrew Hock Soon Ng noted that scholars have regarded "Man-Size in Marble" as a "feminist exposé". Ng suggested that "Laura's depiction possibly satirizes the professional woman who lives 'a full and independent life as man's equal'". Writing in 2013, Brian Johnson also identified feminist themes in the story, suggesting that Nesbit "[exploits] the structures of both the fantastic marvellous and the uncanny to produce a feminist counter-discourse on patriarchy in which the symbolic order itself is coded as monstrous and the human (female) 'other' is its innocent victim." Writing in 2024, Elmar Schenkel stated that in "Man-Size in Marble", "...biography, psychological insight and a questioning of (patriarchal) conceptions intersect".

Writing in 2012, Kathleen Miller cited "Man-Size in Marble" as an example of how "[Nesbit's] late Victorian gothic even used its narrative resources in the service of social intervention, to affirm the erotic and romantic power of 'the disabled.'"

== Adaptations ==
On 1 November 1968, "Man-Size in Marble" was adapted into "The Marble Knights", an episode of the South African horror anthology radio drama series Beyond Midnight.

On 12 April 1977, the story was adapted by Ian Martin into an episode of the radio drama series CBS Radio Mystery Theater, directed by Himan Brown and starring Paul Hecht, Roberta Maxwell, Frances Sternhagen, and Fred Gwynne.

On 18 December 1980, BBC Radio 4 FM aired a reading of "Man-Size in Marble" by John Shedden (adapted by Michael Elder and produced by Patrick Rayner) as part of its A Book at Bedtime programme.

On 4 July 1997, an adaptation of the story written by Christopher Hawes, produced by Marion Nancarrow, and starring Carolyn Jones and Stephen Critchlow aired on BBC Radio 4.

On 1 November 2012, BBC Radio 4 Extra aired a reading of "Man-Size in Marble" by Harry Hadden-Paton as part of its Ghost Stories of E Nesbit programme.

On 24 December 2024, the story was adapted by Mark Gatiss into Woman of Stone, part of the BBC supernatural anthology series A Ghost Story for Christmas, starring Éanna Hardwicke as Jack Lorimer and Celia Imrie as E. Nesbit. In an interview that same month, Gatiss described "Man-Size in Marble" as the first ghost story he ever read, and stated that it had influenced his writing of the 2017 Doctor Who episode "Empress of Mars".
