= Robert Murray Gilchrist =

English novelist (1867–1917)

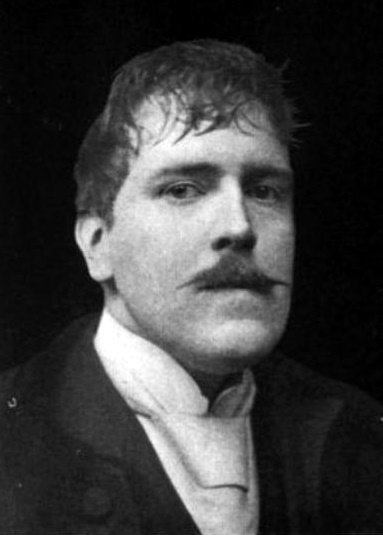
Photograph of the author that appeared in a book published during 1903.

Robert Murray Gilchrist (6 January 1867 – 1917) was an English novelist and author of regional interest books about the Peak District of north central England. He is best known today for his decadent and Gothic short fiction.

During his lifetime he published some 100 short stories, 22 novels, six story collections, and four non-fiction books.

== Life ==
Gilchrist was born in Sheffield, England, the second son of Robert Murray Gilchrist and Isabella. He was educated at Sheffield Royal Grammar School and later privately. He never married. He worked briefly for noted editor William Ernest Henley (1849–1903) at National Observer (formerly The Scots Observer). He lived for much of his life in the North Derbyshire village of Holmesfield, living with his mother and a male companion at Cartledge Hall. From 1893 to 1897, he lived in a remote part of the Peak District and some sources say he lived a few months in Paris, France. He began his writing career during 1890 with the publication of his first novel, Passion The Plaything. He contributed short stories to many periodicals, including The Temple Bar, Home Chimes and The Yellow Book. A productive writer, he published 22 novels, six short story collections, four regional interest books and one play (posthumously). During World War I, he was noted for his charitable assistance to Belgian refugees, many of whom attended his funeral during 1917.

== Literary work ==
As an English novelist and regional writer, Robert Murray Gilchrist never achieved the recognition his colleagues and many critics thought he deserved. His friend, Eden Phillpotts wrote that "no record or estimate of the conte in English letters can be complete without study of his contributions thereto." He dedicated his story collection, The Striking Hours, to Gilchrist, terming him "the master of the short story." Gilchrist's first story collection failed to draw much attention, and while he occasionally published short stories all of his life, including one, "The Crimson Weaver" in the celebrated magazine, The Yellow Book, the bulk of his output was his twenty-two novels, in addition to his six short story collections, a play and four regional guide books. He was friends with many noted writers including Phillpotts, William Sharp (Fiona MacLeod) and Hugh Walpole. He worked for noted editor and writer William Ernest Henley, and he corresponded with Larner Sugden, Kineton Parkes and occasionally H. G. Wells.

Like his better-known contemporary, Vernon Lee, Gilchrist's modern literary revival started with fewer than two dozen strange tales. Virtually forgotten until horror anthologist Hugh Lamb reprinted his stories during the 1970s, his work includes fin-de-siècle Gothic fiction, similar in many ways to the fiction of Robert Louis Stevenson, Oscar Wilde, Bram Stoker, Vernon Lee, Arthur Machen, Eric Stenbock and Richard Marsh.

Gilchrist's first short story collection, The Stone Dragon and Other Tragic Romances (1894) was a collection of weird and Decadent stories. It failed to sell well, and while he occasionally published short stories all his life, the bulk of his output was a score of novels, two plays and two travel guide books. Unsold first printing sheets of The Stone Dragon were later disposed of in 1902 in a plain grey binding with a 1902 catalogue bound in to the rear.

Gilchrist's modern revival began during the mid-1970s when Lamb published five of his Gothic tales in his series of nineteenth century horror anthologies, arguing that Gilchrist was "an unrecognised master of the macabre story" and that The Stone Dragon and Other Tragic Romances was "a book of the most remarkable and subtle fiction ever published". Jack Sullivan in The Penguin Encyclopedia of Horror and the Supernatural described Gilchrist as "a neglected master of horror who deserves revival". Michele Slung, introducing Gilchrist's story "The Basilisk", claimed that "this lush piece of nineteenth century prose has an almost operatic quality" and that the story contained "layers of even more suggestive meaning". Brian Stableford selected three of his tales for The Dedalus Book of Decadence: Moral Ruins (1992). During 1998, the Charon Press reprinted The Stone Dragon, followed by the larger Ash Tree Press collection, The Basilisk and Other Tales of Dread during 2003. During the early part of this century, two articles about Gilchrist appeared in All Hallows, the Canadian-based journal of the Ghost Story Society. His regional interest book, The Dukeries, was reprinted during 2001 and 2009. I Am Stone: The Gothic Weird Tales of R Murray Gilchrist, which includes three tales not previously printed in modern editions, was published in 2021 as part of the British Library's Tales of the Weird series.

== Bibliography ==
=== Novels ===
- Passion the Plaything: A Novel. London: William Heinemann, 1890.
- Frangipanni: A Novel. London: The Regent Library, 1893.
- Hercules and the Marionettes: A Story. London: Bliss, Sands and Company, 1894.
- The Rue Bargain: A Story. London: Grant Richards, 1898.
- Willowbrake: A Novel. London: Methuen, 1898.
- The Courtesy Dame: A Novel. London: William Heinemann, 1900.
- The Labyrinth: A Romance. London: Grant Richards, 1902.
- Beggar's Manor. London: William Heinemann, 1903.
- The Abbey Mystery: A Novel. London: Ward, Lock & Co., 1908.
- The Gentle Thespians. London: J. Milne, 1908.
- The Two Goodwins. London: John Milne, 1908.
- Pretty Fanny's Way. London: Everett and Company, 1909.
- The First Born. London: T Werner Laurie, 1911.
- Willowford Woods. London: Ward, Lock and Company, 1911.
- Damosel Croft: A Novel. London: Stanley Paul and Company, 1912.
- The Secret Tontine. London: John Long, 1912.
- The Roadknight: A Novel. London: Holden & Hardingham, 1913.
- Weird Wedlock. London: John Long, 1913.
- The Chase: A Story. London: F.V. White and Co., 1914.
- Under Cover of Night. London: John Long, 1914.
- Honeysuckle Rogue: A Novel. London: W. Westall, 1917.
- The House of Bats: a Novel. (unpublished manuscript in the Sheffield Archives)
- Belgian Cottage. (unpublished typescript in the Sheffield Archives)

=== Story Collections ===
- The Stone Dragon and Other Tragic Romances. London: Garland, 1894.
- A Peakland Faggot: Tales told of Milton folk. London: Grant Richards, 1897.
- Nicholas and Mary and Other Milton Folk. London: Grant Richards, 1899.
- Natives of Milton: Tales. London: Grant Richards, 1902.
- Lords and Ladies: Stories. London: Hurst and Blackett, 1903.
- Good-bye to Market: A Collection of Stories. London: Simpkin, Marshal Kent and Company, 1908.
- A Peakland Faggot. London: Faber and Gwyer, 1926. [compendium of 1897, 1899 and 1902 collections]

=== Plays ===
- The Climax: Repertory Plays No. 67. London: Gowan and Gray, 1928.

=== Nonfiction ===
- The Dukeries. London: Blackie and Sons, 1911. (reprinted 1913, Dodo Press 2009).
- The Peak District. London: Blackie and Sons, 1911.
- Ripon and Harrowgate. London: Blackie and Sons, 1914.
- Scarborough and Neighbourhood. London: Blackie and Sons, 1914.
