= The Hall of Fantasy =

American old-time radio dramatic anthology

- Genre: Dramatic anthology
- Country of origin: United States
- Language: English
- Home station: WGN
- Syndicates: Mutual
- Created by: Richard Thorne; Carl Greyson
- Directed by: Richard Thorne; Leroy Olliger; Glenn Ransom
- Produced by: Richard Thorne
- Original release: August 22, 1952 – September 28, 1953

The Hall of Fantasy is an American old-time radio dramatic anthology. It was broadcast on the Mutual Broadcasting System from August 22, 1952, to September 28, 1953.

== Format and background ==
The Hall of Fantasy featured supernatural themed stories. Radio historian John Dunning wrote in his reference work Tune in Yesterday: "The difference between this program and its competitors was that here, man was usually the loser. The supernatural was offered as something respectable, awesome, sometimes devastating and always frightening."

An early version of the show was developed by Richard Thorne and Carl Greyson and broadcast on KALL in Salt Lake City, Utah. In 1949, Thorne revived the program on WGN in Chicago, enhancing the program's appeal with "unusually excellent production values" and sound effects.

Stories adapted for the show included "The Cask of Amontillado", by Edgar Allan Poe, and "Green Tea" by Sheridan Le Fanu. Thorne also wrote original scripts for the program, with the series having about equal numbers of original stories and adaptations.

== Personnel ==
As an anthology, The Hall of Fantasy had no continuing characters. Actors frequently heard in its episodes included Harry Elders, Eloise Kummer, Carl Greyson, and Maurice Copeland. Richard Thorne, who produced and directed, also appeared frequently. Leroy Olliger and Glenn Ransom also directed, and Harold Turner provided the music.

== Episodes ==
The January 25, 1953, episode was "The Cask of Amontillado". On February 15, 1953, "Dance of the Devil Dolls" starred Richard Thorne, Janice Jeffreys and Jim Ameche.
