= Home Chimes =

19th-century British magazine

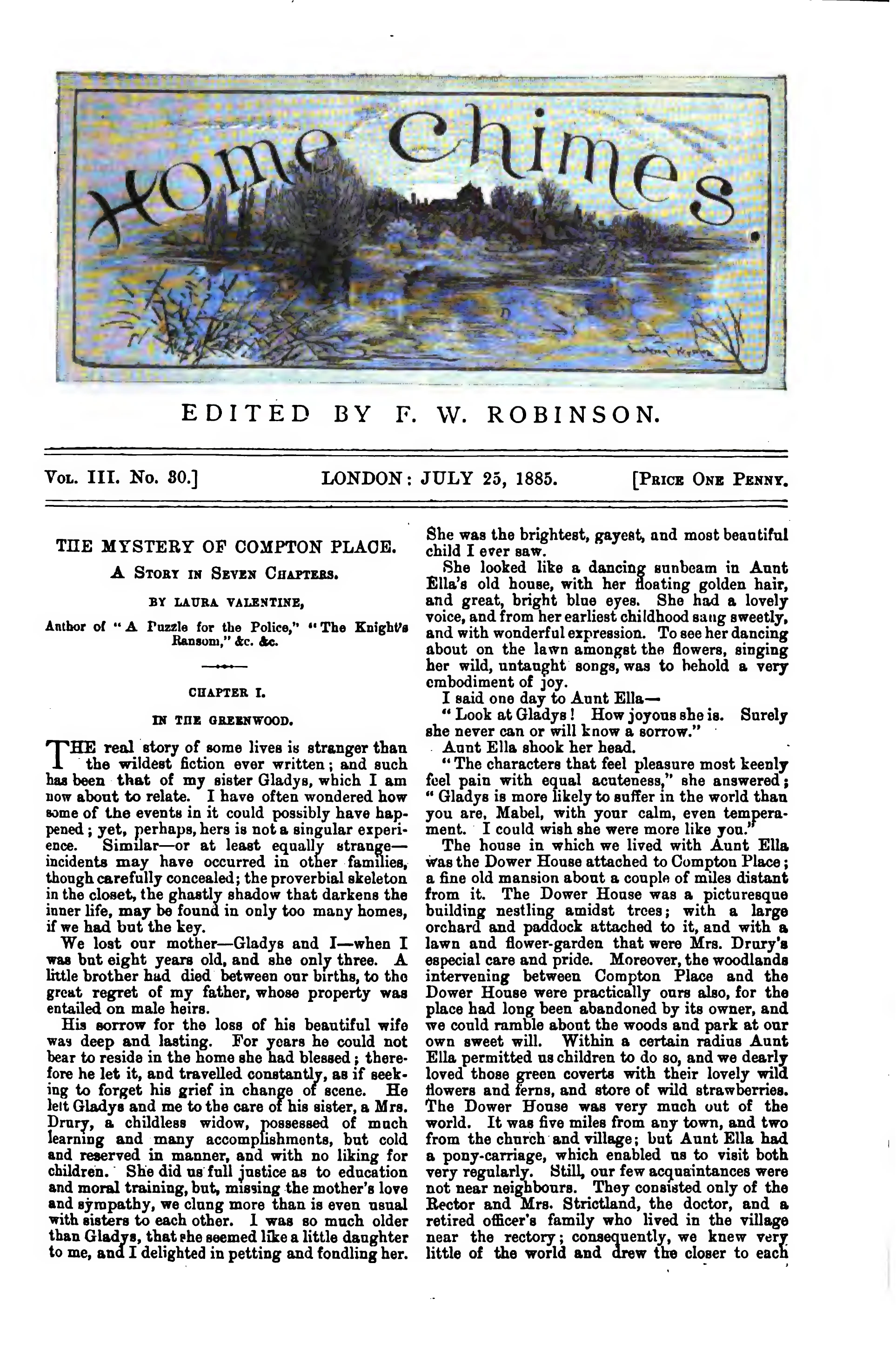
Front page of an 1885 issue

Home Chimes was a London magazine published between 1884 and 1894 by Richard Willoughby, and edited by F. W. Robinson. Originally published as a weekly, it was published as a monthly from January 1886.

Early contributors were J. M. Barrie, who contributed numerous articles, and Jerome K. Jerome, a regular contributor, whose Three Men in a Boat was serialised between 1888 and 1889, as was E. Nesbit's "Man-Size in Marble". Jerome had previously written a series of essays for the magazine which had been published in book form in 1886 as The Idle Thoughts of an Idle Fellow.

Other contributors included Caroline Alice Elgar, wife of Edward Elgar, J. S. Fletcher and Richard Marsh, as well as Swinburne, Bret Harte, Coventry Patmore, Robert Murray Gilchrist, Westland Marston and his son Philip Bourke Marston, Coulson Kernahan, William Sharp, Theodore Watts-Dunton, Israel Zangwill and Eden Phillpotts.
