= Idle Thoughts of an Idle Fellow =

1886 collection of humorous essays by Jerome K. Jerome

- First edition cover
- Author: Jerome K. Jerome
- Genre: Essay collection
- Publication date: 1886

Idle Thoughts of an Idle Fellow, published in 1886, is a collection of humorous essays by Jerome K. Jerome. It was the author’s second published book and it helped establish him as a leading English humorist. While widely considered one of Jerome’s better works, and in spite of using the same style as Three Men in a Boat, it was never as popular as the latter. A second "Idle Thoughts" book, The Second Thoughts of An Idle Fellow, was published in 1898.

The essays had previously appeared in Home Chimes, the same magazine that later serialised Three Men in a Boat.

== Content ==
The book consists of 14 independent articles arranged by themes:

1. ON BEING IDLE.
2. ON BEING IN LOVE.
3. ON BEING IN THE BLUES.
4. ON BEING HARD UP.
5. ON VANITY AND VANITIES.
6. ON GETTING ON IN THE WORLD.
7. ON THE WEATHER.
8. ON CATS AND DOGS.
9. ON BEING SHY.
10. ON BABIES.
11. ON EATING AND DRINKING.
12. ON FURNISHED APARTMENTS.
13. ON DRESS AND DEPORTMENT.
14. ON MEMORY.

== Book excerpts ==
There are various methods by which you may achieve ignominy and shame. By murdering a large and respected family in cold blood and afterward depositing their bodies in the water companies' reservoir, you will gain much unpopularity in the neighborhood of your crime, and even robbing a church will get you cordially disliked, especially by the vicar. But if you desire to drain to the dregs the fullest cup of scorn and hatred that a fellow human creature can pour out for you, let a young mother hear you call dear baby 'it.'

That is just the way with Memory; nothing that she brings to us is complete. She is a willful child; all her toys are broken. I remember tumbling into a huge dust-hole when a very small boy, but I have not the faintest recollection of ever getting out again; and if memory were all we had to trust to, I should be compelled to believe I was there still.

It is impossible to enjoy idling thoroughly unless one has plenty of work to do. There is no fun in doing nothing when you have nothing to do. Wasting time is merely an occupation then, and a most exhausting one. Idleness, like kisses, to be sweet must be stolen.

Swearing relieves the feelings--that is what swearing does. I explained this to my aunt on one occasion, but it didn't answer with her. She said I had no business to have such feelings.

== Influence on other literary works ==
Lazy Thoughts of a Lazy Girl, a book by the pseudonymous "Jenny Wren", was published in 1891. The actual author is still anonymous. The book has the same form as Idle Thoughts of an Idle Fellow, but is from the point of view of a woman.

The foundation of bi-yearly British magazine The Idler was influenced by the title and the ideas expressed in Idle Thoughts of an Idle Fellow.

== Trivia ==
- Jerome dedicated the book to his friend and companion in idleness: his pipe.
