= The Passing of the Third Floor Back (1918 film) =

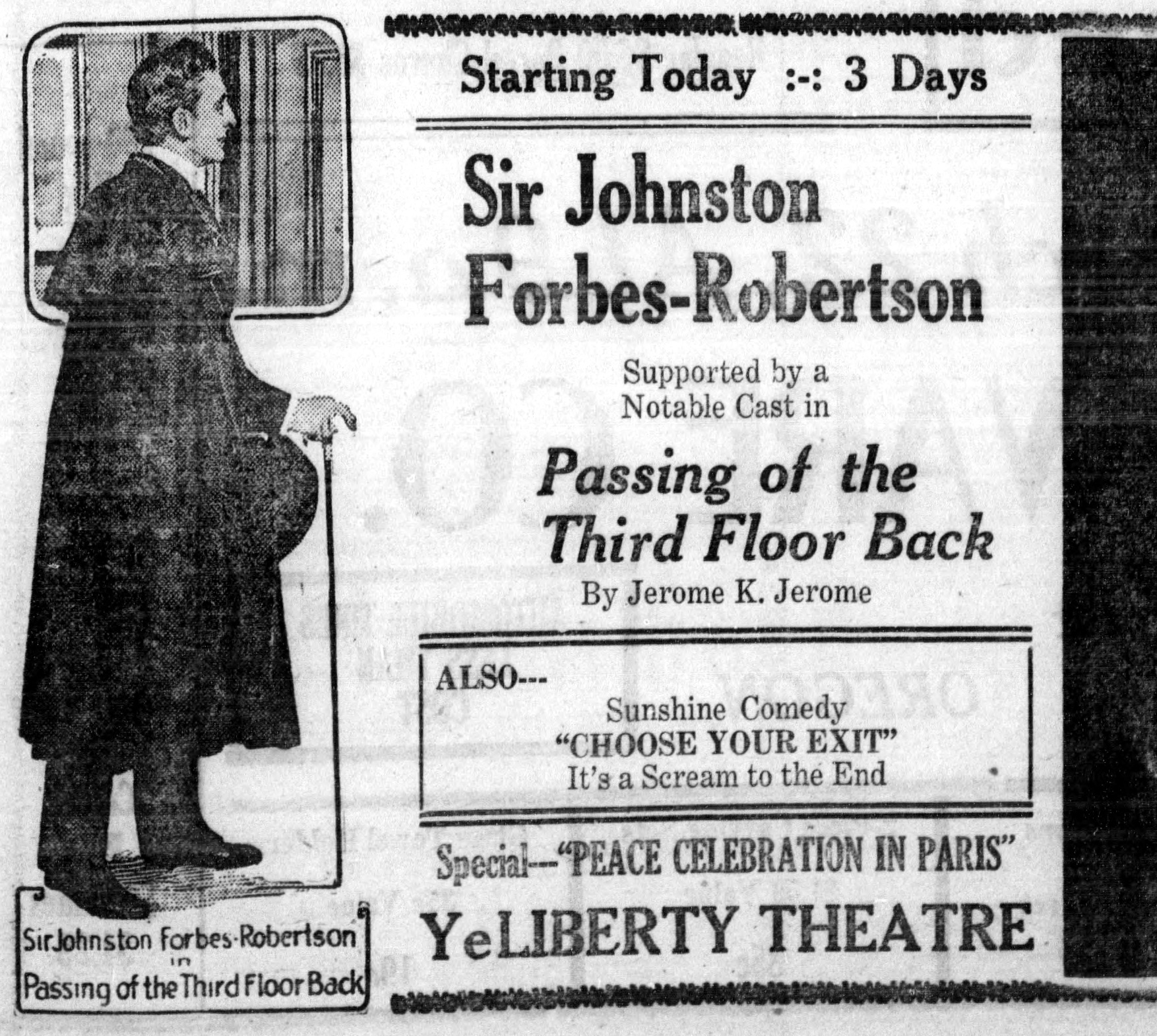
- Advertisement
- Directed by: Herbert Brenon
- Written by: Jerome K. Jerome (play and scenario (?))
- Produced by: Herbert Brenon; First National Pictures
- Starring: Johnston Forbes-Robertson
- Cinematography: J. Roy Hunt
- Distributed by: Associated First National
- Release date: May 1918
- Countries: United Kingdom, USA
- Language: Silent (English intertitles)

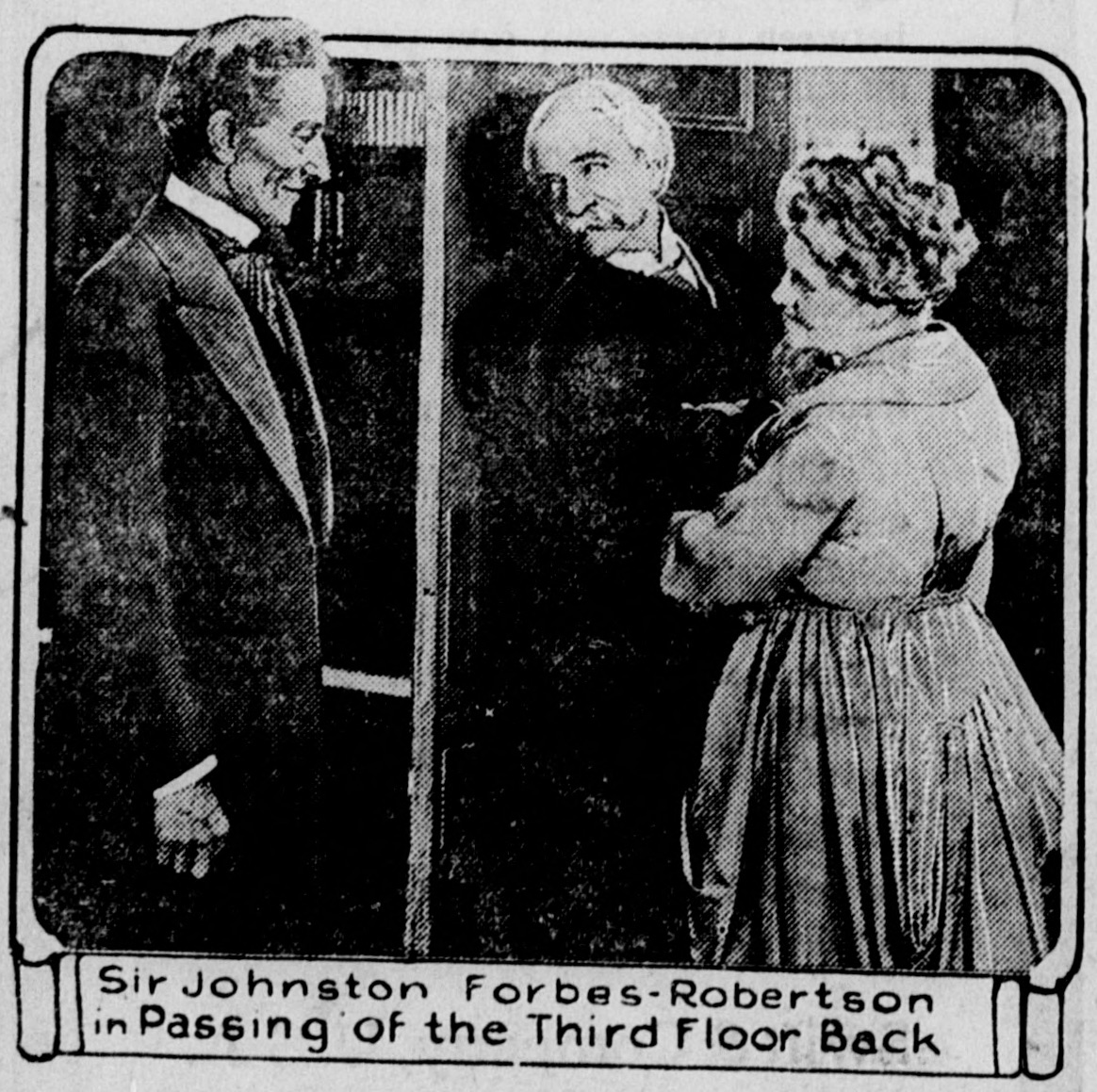
Scene from the film

The Passing of the Third Floor Back is a 1918 British/American silent allegorical film based on the 1908 play The Passing of the Third Floor Back (play)|The Passing of the Third Floor Back]] by Jerome K. Jerome and directed by Herbert Brenon. The star of the film is Sir Johnston Forbes-Robertson, a legendary Shakespearean actor, who starred in the 1909 Broadway presentation of the play and its 1913 revival. Forbes-Robertson had been knighted by King George V in 1913 and had retired from acting in theatre that same year. In his retirement Forbes-Robertson had only dabbled in film acting making a 1913 film version of Hamlet, the most famous role he had played on the stage. Filmed in 1916, TPotTFB, was released in 1918.

== Plot ==
In the boarding house of Mrs. Sharpe there is nothing but discord among her boarders. The "old maid" believes that only false hair and powder will make her beautiful. The major and his wife are constantly quarreling. Their daughter Vivian is being forced into a marriage for money. The young artist accepts an assignment of not the choicest line of work to secure funds to marry Vivian. Harry Larkcom is trying to force his attentions on a weak slavey. However, the arrival of The Stranger and his talk with each make them realize the selfishness and narrowness of their existence, and before long the boarding house is a happy and contented place. With his work done, The Stranger moves on.

== Cast ==
- Sir Johnston Forbes-Robertson as The Stranger (who rents the room from Mrs Sharpe, designated by her as 'the third floor back')
- Molly Pearson as Stasia (Molly Pearson also played this part in the 1909 Broadway play)
- Ketty Galanta
- Augusta Haviland
- George Le Guere as Christopher Penny, A Coward (played by David Powell in the play) (Le Guerre was unbilled)
- Alfred Hickman
- Victory Bateman or Dora Mills Adams as Miss De Hooley, a snob (unbilled)

== Reception ==
In the United States, as in the case of many another American film of the time, The Passing of the Third Floor Back was subject to cuts by city and state film censorship boards. For example, the Chicago Board of Censors cut, in Reel 2, the intertitle "What do you think I'm giving the earings for?", Reel 4, two intertitles "She brought disgrace upon herself" and "I'll be waiting for you tonight. The door will be open", and, Reel 5, the man drinking the poison.
