= Three Men in a Boat =

1889 novel by Jerome K. Jerome

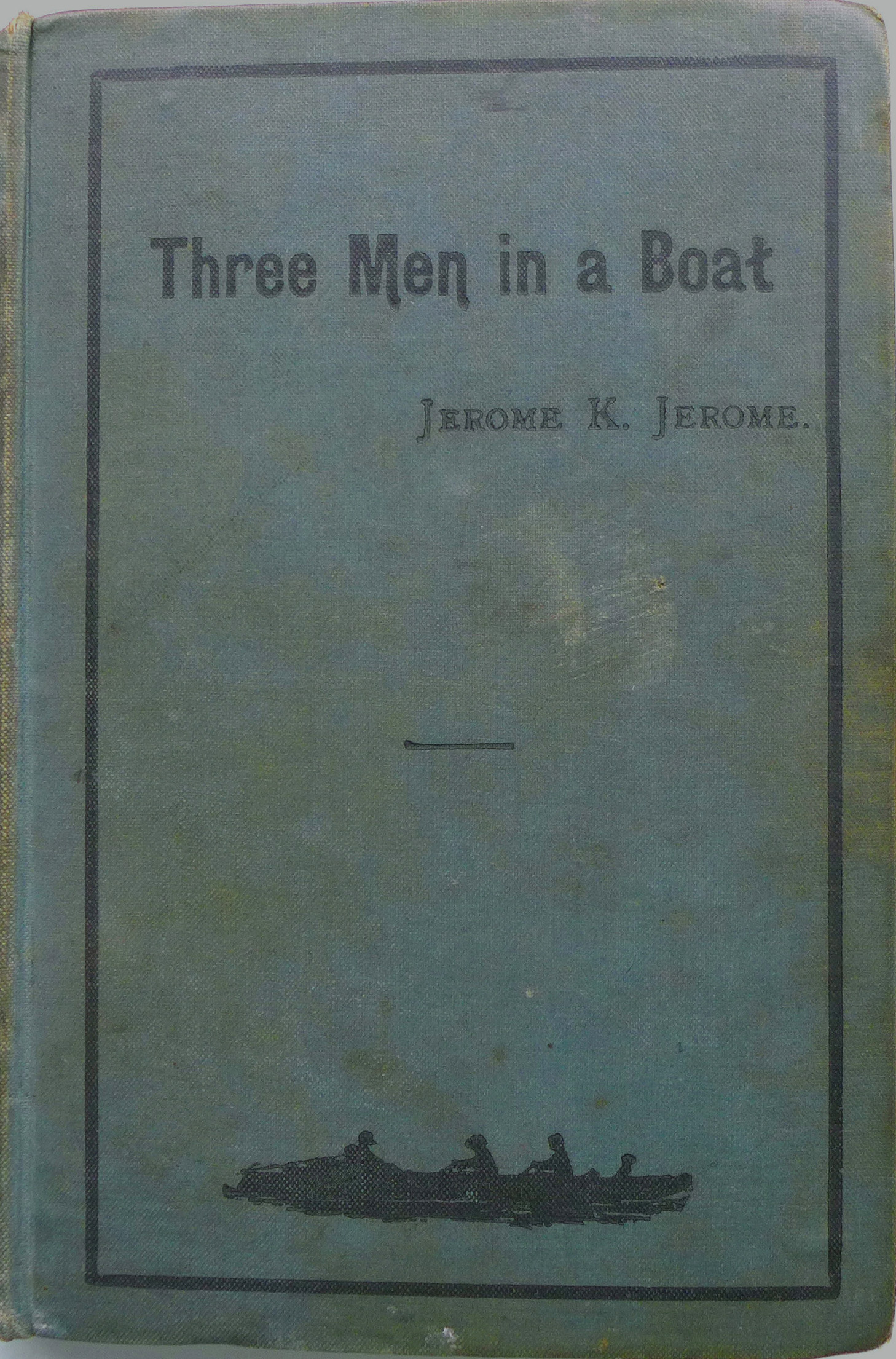
- 1889 edition cover
- Author: Jerome Klapka Jerome
- Language: English
- Genre: Comedy novel
- Publisher: J. W. Arrowsmith
- Publication date: 1889
- Publication place: United Kingdom
- ISBN: 0-7653-4161-1
- OCLC: 213830865
- Followed by: Three Men on the Bummel

Three Men in a Boat (To Say Nothing of the Dog), (Note: The Penguin edition punctuates the title differently: Three Men in a Boat: To Say Nothing of the Dog!) published in 1889, is a humorous novel by English writer Jerome K. Jerome describing a two-week boating holiday on the Thames from Kingston upon Thames to Oxford and back to Kingston. The book was initially intended to be a serious travel guide, with accounts of local history along the route, but the humorous elements took over to the point where the serious and somewhat sentimental passages seem a distraction from the comic novel. One of the most praised things about Three Men in a Boat is how undated it appears to modern readers: the jokes have been praised as fresh and witty a century after publication.

The three men are based on Jerome himself (the narrator Jerome K. Jerome) and two real-life friends: George Wingrave (who would become a senior manager at Barclays Bank) and Carl Hentschel (the founder of a London printing business, called Harris in the book). The trio often took boating trips. The dog, Montmorency, is entirely fictional, but as Jerome stated the canine companion character "developed out of that area of inner consciousness which, in all Englishmen, contains an element of the dog". The trip is a typical boating holiday of the time in a Thames camping skiff. (Note: The boat is called a double sculling skiff in the book – that is, a boat propelled by two people, each using a pair of one-handed oars (sculls). A camping skiff is a boat with an easily erected canvas cover. This effectively turns the boat into a floating tent for overnight use.)

Following the overwhelming success of Three Men in a Boat, Jerome later published a sequel, about a cycling tour in Germany, titled Three Men on the Bummel (also known as Three Men on Wheels, 1900).

== Summary ==
Three Men in a Boat – map of tour

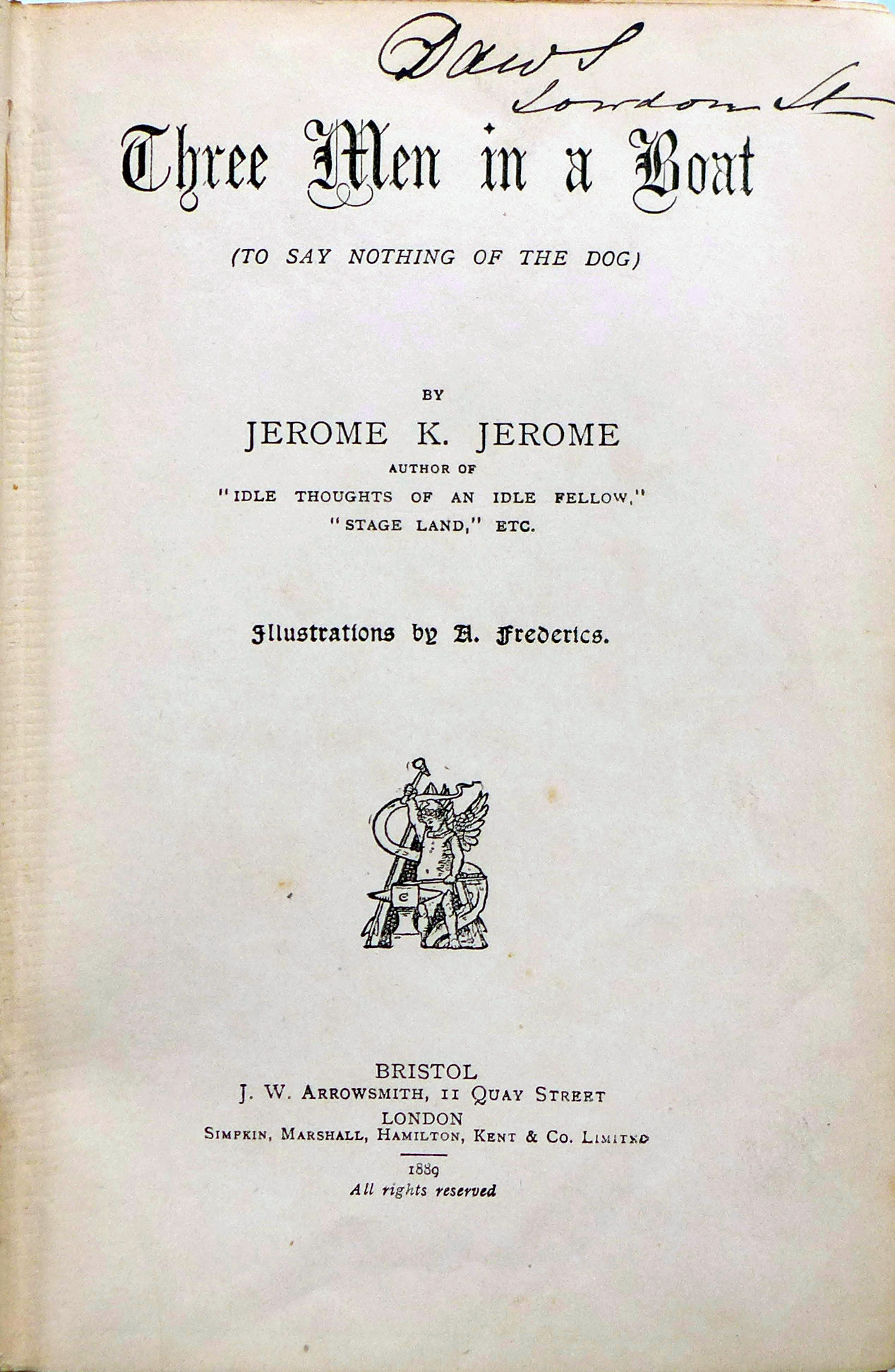
Frontpage Jerome Three Men in a Boat 1889

The story begins by introducing George, Harris, Jerome (always referred to as "J."), and Jerome's dog, Montmorency. The men are spending an evening in J.'s room, smoking and discussing illnesses from which they fancy they suffer. They conclude that they are all suffering from "overwork", and need a holiday. A stay in the country and a sea trip are both considered. The country stay is rejected because Harris claims that it would be dull, and the sea-trip after J. describes bad experiences his brother-in-law and a friend had on previous sea-trips. The three eventually decide on a boating holiday up the River Thames, from Kingston upon Thames to Oxford, during which they will camp, notwithstanding more of J.'s anecdotes about previous mishaps with tents and camping stoves.

They set off the following Saturday. George must go to work that morning, so J. and Harris make their way to Kingston by train. They cannot find the right train at Waterloo station (the station's confusing layout was a well-known theme of Victorian comedy) so they bribe a train driver to take his train to Kingston, where they collect the hired boat and start the journey. They meet George further up-river at Weybridge.

The remainder of the story describes their river journey and the incidents that occur. The book's original purpose as a guidebook is apparent as J., the narrator, describes passing landmarks and villages such as Hampton Court Palace, Hampton Church, Magna Carta Island and Monkey Island, and muses on historical associations of these places. However, he frequently digresses into humorous anecdotes that range from the unreliability of barometers for weather forecasting to the difficulties encountered when learning to play the Scottish bagpipes. The most frequent topics of J.'s anecdotes are river pastimes such as fishing and boating and the difficulties they present to the inexperienced and unwary and to the three men on previous boating trips.

The book includes classic comedy set pieces, such as the Plaster of Paris trout in chapter 17, and the "Irish stew" in chapter 14 – made by mixing most of the leftovers in the party's food hamper:

I forget the other ingredients, but I know nothing was wasted; and I remember that, towards the end, Montmorency, who had evinced great interest in the proceedings throughout, strolled away with an earnest and thoughtful air, reappearing, a few minutes afterwards, with a dead water-rat in his mouth, which he evidently wished to present as his contribution to the dinner; whether in a sarcastic spirit, or with a genuine desire to assist, I cannot say.

We had a discussion as to whether the rat should go in or not. Harris said that he thought it would be all right, mixed up with the other things, and that every little helped; but George stood up for precedent. He said he had never heard of water-rats in Irish stew, and he would rather be on the safe side, and not try experiments.

== Reception ==
One might have imagined ... that the British Empire was in danger. ... The Standard spoke of me as a menace to English letters; and The Morning Post as an example of the sad results to be expected from the over-education of the lower orders. ... I think I may claim to have been, for the first twenty years of my career, the best abused author in England.

— Jerome K. Jerome, My Life and Times (1926)

The reception by critics varied between lukewarm and hostile. The use of slang was condemned as "vulgar" and the book was derided as written to appeal to "'Arrys and 'Arriets" – then common sneering terms for working-class Londoners who dropped their Hs when speaking. Punch magazine dubbed Jerome "'Arry K. 'Arry". Modern commentators have praised the humour, but criticised the book's unevenness, as the humorous sections are interspersed with more serious passages written in a sentimental, sometimes purple, style.

Yet the book sold in huge numbers. "I pay Jerome so much in royalties", the publisher told a friend, "I cannot imagine what becomes of all the copies of that book I issue. I often think the public must eat them." The first edition was published in August 1889 and serialised in the magazine Home Chimes in the same year. (Note: Home Chimes was published 1884–1894 by Richard Willoughby, London, price 1/-. It was a (first weekly, then monthly) miscellany, mostly fiction by little-known authors. See Magazine Data File) The first edition remained in print from 1889 until March 1909, when the second edition was issued. During that time, 202,000 copies were sold. In his introduction to the 1909 second edition, Jerome states that he had been told another million copies had been sold in America by pirate printers. The book was translated into many languages. The Russian edition was particularly successful and became a standard school textbook. Jerome later complained in a letter to The Times of Russian books not written by him, published under his name to benefit from his success. Since its publication, Three Men in a Boat has never been out of print. It continues to be popular, with The Guardian listing it as one of The 100 Greatest Novels of All Time in 2003, and in 2015 and Esquire including it in the 50 Funniest Books Ever in 2009. In 2003, the book was no. 101 in the BBC's list of "the nation's favourite novels" for The Big Read.

== In popular culture ==
The river trip is easy to recreate, following the detailed description, and this is sometimes done by fans of the book. Much of the route remains unchanged. For example, all the pubs and inns named are still open, with the exception of The Crown in Marlow, which closed in 2008. (Note: The Blue Posts, 81 Newman Street, London;The Royal Stag and the Manor House (the latter now called The Manor Hotel) at Datchet; The George and Dragon at Wargrave; The Bull at Sonning; The Swan at Pangbourne; The Bull at Streatley; and The Barley Mow at Clifton Hampden. The Bells of Ouseley at Old Windsor still exists, but the building was demolished and rebuilt in 1936. The Crown at Marlow moved to the adjacent building in the 1930s, and a Boots chemist is now in the original location. In its new location, the Crown lasted until 2008, when it was closed permanently, and replaced with first a kitchenware shop, and then a cinema.)

=== Audio ===
Audiobooks of the book have been released many times, with different narrators, including Sir Timothy Ackroyd (2013), David McCallum (1994), Hugh Laurie (1999), Nigel Planer (1999), Martin Jarvis (2005) and Steven Crossley (2011).

The BBC has broadcast on radio a number of dramatisations of the story, including a musical version in 1962 starring Kenneth Horne, Leslie Phillips and Hubert Gregg, a three-episode version in 1984 with Jeremy Nicholas playing all the characters and a two-part adaptation for Classic Serial in 2013 with Hugh Dennis, Steve Punt and Julian Rhind-Tutt.

=== Film and television ===
- Three Men in a Boat, a 1920 silent British film with Lionelle Howard as J., H. Manning Haynes as Harris and Johnny Butt as George.
- Three Men in a Boat a 1933 British film with William Austin, Edmund Breon, and Billy Milton.
- Three Men in a Boat, a 1956 British film with David Tomlinson as J., Jimmy Edwards as Harris and Laurence Harvey as George.
- Three Men in a Boat, a 1961 German film very loosely based on the book.
- Three Men in a Boat, a 1975 BBC-produced version for television adapted by Tom Stoppard and directed by Stephen Frears, with Tim Curry as J., Michael Palin as Harris, and Stephen Moore as George.
- Three Men in a Boat, not counting the dog (Russian: Трое в лодке, не считая собаки), a 1979, musical comedy filmed by Soviet television, with Andrei Mironov as J., Aleksandr Shirvindt as Harris and Mikhail Derzhavin as George.

Peter Lovesey's Victorian detective novel Swing, Swing Together (1976), partly based on the book, featured as the second episode of the television series Cribb (1980).

In 2005 the comedians Griff Rhys Jones, Dara Ó Briain, and Rory McGrath embarked on a recreation of the novel for what was to become a regular yearly BBC TV series, Three Men in a Boat. Their first expedition was along the Thames from Kingston upon Thames to Oxford, recreating the original novel.

=== Theatre ===
A stage adaptation earned Jeremy Nicholas a Best Newcomer in a Play nomination at the 1981 Laurence Olivier Awards. The book was adapted by Clive Francis for a 2006 production that toured the UK.

=== Art ===
A sculpture of a stylised boat was created in 1999 to commemorate Three Men in a Boat on the Millennium Green in New Southgate, London, where the author lived as a child. In 2012 a mosaic of a dog's head was put onto the same Green to commemorate Montmorency.

=== Other works of literature ===
In 1891, Three Women in One Boat: A River Sketch by Constance MacEwen was published. This book relates the journey of three young university women who set out to emulate the river trip in Three Men in a Boat in an effort to raise the spirits of one of them, who is about to be expelled from university. They bring a cat called Tintoretto in place of Montmorency.

P. G. Wodehouse mentions the Plaster of Paris trout in his 1910 novel Psmith in the City. Psmith's boss, while delivering a political speech, pretends to have personally experienced a succession of men claiming to have caught a fake trout. Psmith interrupts the speech to "let him know that a man named Jerome had pinched his story."

Three Men in a Boat is referenced in the 1956 parody novel on mountaineering, The Ascent of Rum Doodle, where the head porter Bing is said to spend "much of his leisure immersed in a Yogistani translation of it."

In Have Space Suit—Will Travel, by Robert A. Heinlein (1958), the main character's father is an obsessive fan of the book, and spends much of his spare time repeatedly re-reading it.

The book Three Men (Not) in a Boat: and Most of the Time Without a Dog (1983, republished 2011, Duckworth: ISBN 978-0715617175) by Timothy Finn is a loosely related novel about a walking trip.

A re-creation in 1993 by poet Kim Taplin and companions resulted in the travelogue Three Women in a Boat.

Another re-creation of Jerome's journey appeared in the same year. Two and a Half Men in a Boat by novelist Nigel Williams described the author's trip down the Thames accompanied by two friends (explorer JP and BBC executive Alan) and Williams's dog Badger.

Gita sul Tevere (Tre uomini su un barcone in compagnia di un cane non proprio di razza) [A Trip on the Tiber (Three men on a boat with a not-so-purebred dog)]". (ISBN 978-8891116277) is an Italian humorous book inspired by this novel.

Science fiction author Connie Willis paid tribute to Jerome's novel in her own 1997 Hugo Award–winning book To Say Nothing of the Dog. Her time-travelling protagonist also takes an ill-fated voyage on the Thames with two humans and a dog as companions, and encounters George, Harris, 'J' and Montmorency. The title of Willis's novel refers to the full title of the original book.

Fantasy author Harry Turtledove wrote a set of stories in which Jerome's characters encounter supernatural creatures: "Three Men and a Vampire" and "Three Men and a Werewolf" were published in Some Time Later: Fantastic Voyages in Alternate Worlds (2017). "Three Men and a Sasquatch" was published in Next Stop on the #13 in 2019.

Anne Youngson wrote Three Women and a Boat (Penguin, 2021), about three middle-aged strangers setting off on an adventure in a narrowboat. The novel was chosen for BBC Radio 2 Book Club.

In L’amica geniale by Elena Ferrante, a copy of Tre uomini in barca by Jerome K. Jerome is awarded to protagonist Elena Greco as 4th prize for most frequent use of the local library.

The 2022 novel Roman fleuve by the French writer Philibert Humm is partially a hommage to Three Men in a Boat and follows three friends who travel along the Seine in canoes.

== See also ==
- Locks on the River Thames
- Rowing on the River Thames
- Skiffing
- Thames meander, a long-distance journey over all or part of the River Thames

== General bibliography ==
- Jerome, Jerome K. Three Men in a Boat (To Say Nothing of the Dog). Bristol: Arrowsmith, 1889.
- Jerome, Jerome K. Three Men in a Boat, to Say Nothing of the Dog! Wordsworth Classics. ISBN 1-85326-051-7, with Boulter's Lock by Edward John Gregory on the cover, 1993.
- Jerome, Jerome K., Jeremy Lewis. Three Men in a Boat: To Say Nothing of the Dog! and Three Men on the Bummel. Penguin Classics. London: Penguin Books, 1999. ISBN 0-14-0437509.
