= Jerome K. Jerome =

English writer and humorist (1859–1927)

- Jerome in the 1890s
- Born: Jerome Clapp Jerome; 2 May 1859; Walsall, Staffordshire, England
- Died: 14 June 1927 (aged 68); Northampton, England
- Resting place: St Mary's Church, Ewelme, Oxfordshire
- Occupations: Author, playwright, editor
- Spouse: Georgina Elizabeth Henrietta Stanley Marris (m. 1888)
- Writing career
- Genres: Fiction; drama

Jerome Klapka Jerome (2 May 1859 – 14 June 1927) was an English writer and humorist, best known for the comic travelogue Three Men in a Boat (1889). Other works include the essay collections Idle Thoughts of an Idle Fellow (1886) and Second Thoughts of an Idle Fellow; Three Men on the Bummel, a sequel to Three Men in a Boat; and several other novels.

Jerome was born in Walsall, in the English Midlands. Although his family struggled with poverty at times, he was able to attend a grammar school, but derived little benefit from it. After his father died in 1871 Jerome tried to earn a living in various occupations including a clerical post and three years as an actor. In his twenties he began writing and was able to publish some work, with increasing success. He married in 1888 and he published his most popular work, Three Men in a Boat, the following year. He continued to write fiction and non-fiction over the next few decades, though never with the same level of success. He also wrote plays, of which The Passing of the Third Floor Back (1908) was the most successful. Most have remained unpublished.

His works were generally more popular with the general public than with reviewers, many of whom looked down on Jerome, declaring his writing colloquial and vulgar – the very characteristics that appealed to the book-buying and theatre-going public. Punch dubbed him "'Arry J. 'Arry". It was not until the publication of his semi-autobiographical novel Paul Kelver in 1902 that heavyweight critics began praising him.

== Life and career ==
=== Early years ===
Jerome was born in Walsall, England on 2 May 1859. He was the fourth and last child of Jerome Clapp (who later took the name Jerome Clapp Jerome) and his wife Marguerite, née Jones. Jerome junior was registered at birth as Jerome Clapp Jerome. He had two sisters, Paulina and Blandina, and one brother, Milton; the last died at an early age. The exiled Hungarian general György Klapka was staying with Jerome's family at the time of the boy's birth, and Jerome later adopted that surname as a second given name.

Jerome's father was a nonconformist lay preacher and Staffordshire coalmine owner; the boy's mother was the daughter of a Swansea lawyer. The biographer Damian Atkinson writes that Jerome senior was of puritan background and had trained as an architect and that his wife, also from a nonconformist family, had some financial assets. After the failure of the colliery the family moved to Stourbridge, Worcestershire, and later to east London, where Jerome senior became an ironmonger, though he saw little success.

At the age of nine Jerome passed the entry test for the Philological School of General Instruction in Lisson Grove, Marylebone, which later became St Marylebone Grammar School. There he had his only formal education. He was not impressed by the school. He saw its methods as foolish and useless, cramming pupils full of unusable fact. The only good thing he had to say of the establishment was that it did not employ corporal punishment. In 1871, when Jerome was thirteen, his father died of a heart attack and the boy became the family's sole wage-earner, leaving school to become a clerk for the London and North Western Railway. The pay was not generous and Jerome worked a great deal of overtime to support the family. His biographer Joseph Connolly writes, "He had not enjoyed school, and neither did he enjoy being a clerk. Sitting at a desk doing what he was told was not his idea of how life should be spent".

=== Theatre ===
Jerome was inspired by his sister Blandina's love for the theatre, and he decided to try his hand at acting in 1877. He joined a repertory troupe that produced plays on a shoestring budget, often drawing on the actors' own meagre resources – Jerome was penniless at the time – to purchase costumes and props. After three years on the road with no evident success, the 21-year-old Jerome decided that he had had enough of stage life and sought other occupations. He tried to become a journalist, writing essays, satires, and short stories, but most of them were rejected. Over the next few years, he was a schoolmaster, a packer, and a solicitor's clerk. He wrote prolifically in his spare time but success was elusive until his story On the Stage – and Off, a comic memoir of his experiences with the acting troupe, was published in 1885. It came out in weekly instalments in a paper called The Play.

The following year Jerome made a modestly successful début as a playwright with a gentle one-act comedy, a curtain-raiser to a farce at the Globe Theatre, London. The theatrical newspaper The Era commented:

Barbara is a very interesting little piece, giving promise of even greater things. It is well written, and the plot, what there is of it, is constructed without too many signs of that clumsiness which so often reveals the hand of the amateur in stagecraft. … The success of Barbara was beyond question, and we may expect that for a considerable time it will amuse those who attend …

Jerome was able to sell the American rights to the piece to the actor-manager J. K. Emmett.

=== Success ===
In 1886 Jerome had his first big seller with the book Idle Thoughts of an Idle Fellow (1886), a collection of humorous essays that had previously appeared in a newly founded magazine, Home Chimes, which would later serialise Three Men in a Boat. Idle Thoughts of an Idle Fellow sold exceptionally well. His publisher, Andrew W. Tuer, had the book bound in a very pale lemon cloth, which stood out well from the dark greens and browns more usual at the time, and he hit on a way of convincing the public that the book was a runaway best-seller: after the sale of a thousand copies, the words "Second Edition" were added to the cover. When the sale of two thousand was reached, "Third Edition" was substituted. Connolly comments, "This ingenious and curious device persisted, and before very long the book world was talking of little other than Jerome's new book, now in its 'twelfth' edition!"

Financially comfortable for the first time in his life, Jerome was now able to marry. His bride, Georgina, had divorced her abusive first husband, William Marris, for "misconduct and cruelty", receiving a decree nisi in December 1887, which became a decree absolute on 12 June 1888. She was awarded custody of their only child (also called Georgina, but known by her middle name, Elsie). On 21 June 1888, nine days after her decree absolute, she married Jerome at St Luke's Church, Chelsea. They were both aged 29. The best man was George Wingrave, a bank clerk, with whom Jerome had shared various sets of lodgings over several years. The couple took a flat in Chelsea, with a nurse to look after Elsie. They later had a daughter, Rowena, born in 1897, who became an actress. (Note: Among her stage roles was Stasia in the 1917 West End revival of her father's The Passing of the Third Floor Back.)

Jerome remained keenly interested in writing for the theatre. His later plays of the 1880s were two one-act pieces: Fennel (1888, an English adaptation of François Coppée's Le Luthier de Crémone) and Sunset (1888, inspired by a poem by Tennyson).

=== Three Men in a Boat ===
Jerome, encouraged by his wife, gave up his post at the solicitor's office to become a full-time writer. He felt he needed a holiday and proposed to hire a skiff for a trip up the Thames, as he had done several times before, with two close male friends. George Wingrave and Carl Hentschel made up the party. Both, like Jerome, were now moderately prosperous: the former had been promoted at the bank and the latter was a rising artist and photographer. Thinking the trip should be a working holiday that might furnish material for a book, Jerome took a notebook with him. He later recalled:

Harris sings Gilbert and Sullivan – badly (Chapter VIII)

I did not intend to write a funny book … There was to be humorous relief, but the book was to have been The Story of the Thames, its scenery and history. Somehow it would not come. I was just back from my honeymoon, and had the feeling that all the world’s troubles were over. About the "humorous relief" I had no difficulty. I decided to write the "humorous relief" first – get it off my chest, so to speak. After which, in sober frame of mind, I could tackle the scenery and history. I never got there. It seemed to be all "humorous relief".

The book, published in 1889, is a lively and, except for a few serious scenes, comic account of the Thames trip of the three friends. Wingrave is disguised in the text as "George" tout court, Hentschel as "William Samuel Harris" and Jerome as "J.". The dog, Montmorency, was an invention of Jerome's. Reviewers were not impressed by the book, finding it colloquial and vulgar. Punch dubbed Jerome "'Arry J. 'Arry". Connolly comments, "the public loved it for the very reasons that the critics loathed it: it was modern, vulgar, of the people, and written in the very way … in which people spoke". He adds, "A really funny book was as rare then as it always is, and the public valued it". It sold in prodigious numbers. Atkinson comments that the book's combination of "light-hearted satire, sharp dialogue, and slapstick has made it perennially popular, and it is the book for which Jerome is remembered". James Arrowsmith, its publisher, remarked, "I can’t imagine what becomes of all the copies of that book I issue. I often think the public must eat them".

In 1909 Jerome wrote, "I have written books that have appeared to me more clever, books that have appeared to me more humorous. But it is as the author of Three Men in a Boat (to say nothing of the Dog) that the public persists in remembering me". He acknowledged that the enormous sales in countries including the United States brought him fame and popularity – "an asset not to be despised" – but he did not benefit financially. Although the Berne Convention, protecting authors' copyrights, had been agreed in 1886, the US did not sign up to it until much later, and unauthorised "pirate" American editions were issued. Jerome wrote in 1909, "In Chicago I was assured many years ago, by an enterprising pirate now retired, that the sales throughout the United States had exceeded a million".

=== 1890s ===
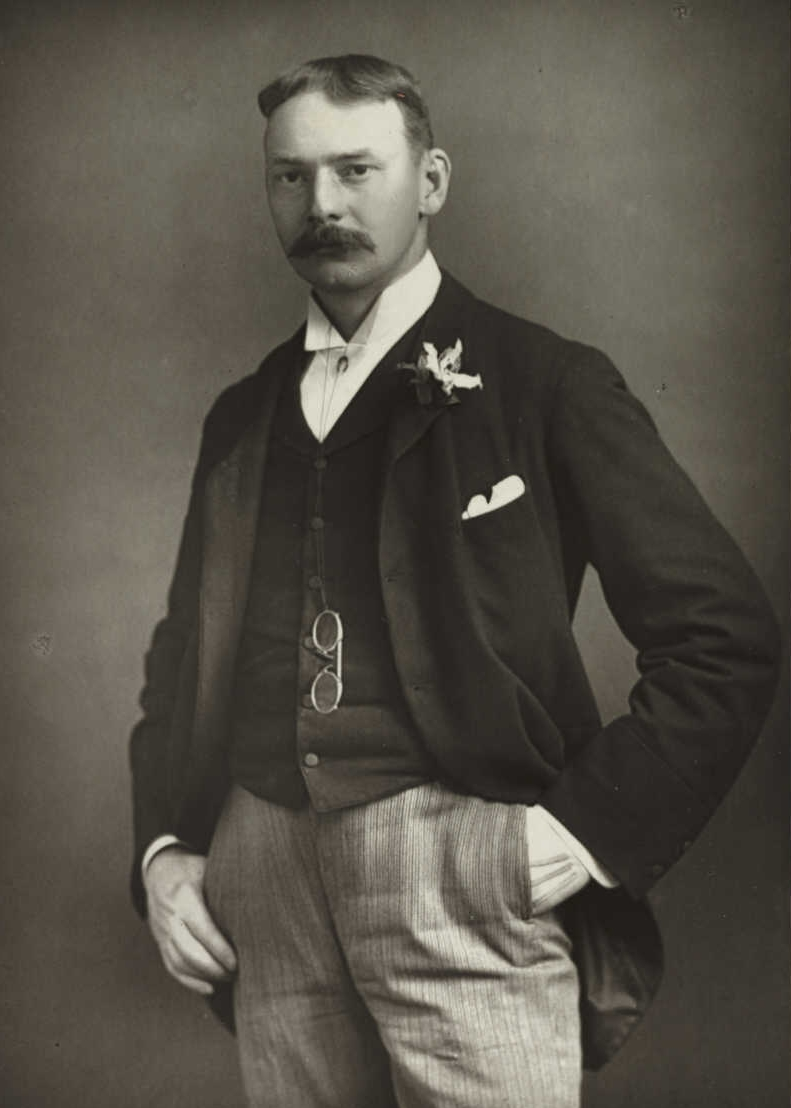
Jerome, 1890s

Jerome co-edited The Idler, an illustrated monthly founded by Robert Barr in 1892. As editor he published writing by, among many others, Mark Twain, Robert Louis Stevenson, Rudyard Kipling and Arthur Conan Doyle, as well as younger writers such as Eden Phillpotts and W. W. Jacobs. Features of the magazine were the informal discussions of the Idlers' Club, and The Idler monthly teas, where the editors met their contributors – an innovation at that time. After a disagreement with Barr, Jerome became sole editor from August 1895 to November 1897. In 1893 Jerome founded the weekly To-Day and added to his contributors the writers Richard Le Gallienne and George Gissing and the illustrators Aubrey Beardsley and Phil May. Although fond of Germany and its people, in To-Day he continually attacked Wilhelm II and warned his readers to beware of the Kaiser's overweening ambition. His uncompromising journalism led to a libel action in 1897. In To-Day he accused an inventor, Sampson Fox, of attempting to rig or corner the market in water gas patents. Jerome lost the case, and although the damages were a nominal farthing, each side had to pay its own legal costs, which in Jerome's case were £9,000. This forced him to sell his interest in both magazines.

Jerome continued to write for the stage in the 1890s. His plays of the decade were New Lamps for Old 1890; Ruth 1890; Woodbarrow Farm 1891; The Prude's Progress 1895; The Rise of Dick Halward 1896; Biarritz (a "musical farce" with lyrics by Adrian Ross and music by F. Osmond Carr), 1896; The MacHaggis 1898; and Miss Hobbs (1899). The theatre critic A. B. Walkley wrote of the first of these that it was a comedy in the line of those by Pierre de Marivaux and Henri Meilhac, but a little less subtle. Most of these plays, like most of his others, remained unpublished.

=== 20th century ===
In 1900 Jerome published Three Men on the Bummel (Note: According to the Oxford English Dictionary a "bummel", from the German Bummel stroll, wander", means "A leisurely stroll or journey; a wander, a saunter".) (titled Three Men on Wheels in the US). It recounts the doings of George, Harris and J. – now older and the last two married, leaving their wives at home – on a cycling trip through Germany. It did not match the enormous success of Three Men in a Boat. Jeremy Nicholas, president of the Jerome K. Jerome Society, writes that "although it is written with the same verve and energy, and the set pieces … are as polished and funny (funnier, some would say) as anything in the earlier book" it lacks the unifying theme of the River Thames.

Jerome published a semi-autobiographical novel, Paul Kelver, in 1902. It was exceptionally well received. The Times called it "a remarkably good book"; The Pall Mall Gazette said, "The book is really great. Everything is there – humour and pathos, sympathy and wisdom. One laughs, and cries, and approves. The book, in short, must admit him to the ranks of the great English novelists of the day". Several reviewers ranked the book with the novels of Charles Dickens. Jerome regarded it as his best work.

Johnston Forbes-Robertson as the stranger in The Passing of the Third Floor Back

It was not until 1908 that Jerome won real fame as a dramatist, with The Passing of the Third Floor Back, described as a modern Morality play. It was produced at the St James's Theatre with Johnston Forbes-Robertson in the leading role. The play was revived in London in 1913, twice in 1917, and in 1928 and 1929, and in New York twice in 1910 and again in 1914. The play divided the critics. The reviewer in The Bystander wrote, "The Passing of the Third Floor Back may be considered a sort of morality play which must be swallowed whole or altogether rejected. I think it will be accepted just as it is, and be considered a highly successful essay in a difficult branch of art". Max Beerbohm in The Saturday Review called it "vilely stupid" and the work of a "tenth-rate writer"; his opposite number in The Sketch wrote, "In the first place, let me state that The Passing of the Third-Floor Back is a play that nobody who is capable of appreciating a noble theme handled in a fine, sincere, and fearless way can afford to miss". The Daily Telegraph commented that Jerome "has boldly grappled with a grave and weighty theme, and his courage has been amply rewarded". Beerbohm admitted, "greater enthusiasm have I seldom seen in a theatre", and the play was exceedingly popular with audiences. Jerome adapted the play from a short story, published in 1908 in a collection along with five other of his stories, "The Philosopher's Joke", "The Soul of Nicholas Snyders", "Mrs Korner Sins her Mercies", "The Cost of Kindness" and "The Love of Ulrich Nebendahl". Jerome's other plays include Fanny and the Servant Problem (1908), The Master of Mrs Chilvers (1911), on the woman suffrage problem, and The Great Gamble, a study of German life produced shortly before the outbreak of war in 1914.

Jerome visited Germany, Norway, and Russia and made successful lecture tours of the US in 1908 and 1914. During the First World War, being too old for the British army, he served as an ambulance driver in the French army. He recorded his experiences in his autobiography My Life and Times (1926), a book which, in the view of Atkinson, "shows him at his idiosyncratic best". During his later years his London home was in Belsize Park, where he lived with his wife and daughter.

In 1927, despite declining health, Jerome decided to make a long motoring tour through England; he was taken ill, and died in a hospital in Northampton on 14 June 1927, aged 68. His body was cremated at Golders Green crematorium, and his ashes subsequently buried in the churchyard of St Mary's Church, Ewelme, near his country home in Oxfordshire. A tablet to his memory was placed on the house at Walsall where he was born. His wife died on 29 October 1938, aged seventy-eight, and was buried beside him.

== Works by Jerome ==
Novels

- Three Men in a Boat (To Say Nothing of the Dog) (1889)
- Diary of a Pilgrimage (and Six Essays) (1891)
- Weeds: A Story in Seven Chapters (1892)
- Novel Notes (1893)
- Three Men on the Bummel (a.k.a. Three Men on Wheels) (1900)
- Paul Kelver, a novel (1902)
- Tea-table Talk (1903)
- Tommy and Co (1904)
- They and I (1909)
- All Roads Lead to Calvary (1919)
- Anthony John (1923)

Collections

- Idle Thoughts of an Idle Fellow (1886)
- Stage-Land: Curious Habits and Customs of its Inhabitants (1889)
- Told After Supper (1891)
- John Ingerfield: And Other Stories (1894)
- Sketches in Lavender, Blue, and Green (1895)
- Second Thoughts of an Idle Fellow (1898)
- The Observations of Henry (1901)
- The Angel and the Author – and Others (1904) (20 essays)
- American Wives – and Others (1904) (25 essays, comprising 5 from The Angel and the Author, and 20 from Idle Ideas in 1905).
- Idle Ideas in 1905 (1905)
- The Passing of the Third Floor Back: And Other Stories (1907)
- Malvina of Brittany (1916)
- A miscellany of sense and nonsense from the writings of Jerome K. Jerome. Selected by the author with many apologies, with forty-three illustrations by Will Owen. 1924

Autobiography

- On the Stage—and Off (1885)
- My Life and Times (1926)

Short stories

- The Haunted Mill (1891)
- The New Utopia (1891)
- The Dancing Partner (1893)
- Evergreens
- Christmas Eve in the Blue Chamber
- Silhouettes
- The Skeleton
- The Snake
- The Woman of the Saeter
- The Philosopher's Joke (1909)
- The Love of Ulrich Nebendahl (1909)

Plays

- Pity is Akin to Love (1888)
- The Maister of Wood Barrow: play in three acts (1890)
- What Women Will Do (1890)
- Birth and Breeding (1890) — based on Die Ehre, produced in New York in 1895 as "Honour"
- The Rise of Dick Halward (1895), produced in New York the previous year as "The Way to Win a Woman"
- The Prude's Progress (1895) co-written with Eden Phillpotts
- The MacHaggis (1897)
- John Ingerfield (1899)
- The Night of 14 Feb.. 1899: a play in nine scenes
- Miss Hobbs: a comedy in four acts (1902)
- Tommy (1906)
- Sylvia of the Letters (1907)
- The Passing of the Third Floor Back (1908, also the basis of a 1918 film and a 1935 film)
- Fanny and the Servant Problem, a quite possible play in four acts (1909)
- The Master of Mrs Chilvers: an improbable comedy, imagined by Jerome K. Jerome (1911)
- Esther Castways (1913)
- The Great Gamble (1914)
- The Three Patriots (1915)
- The Soul of Nicholas Snyders : A Mystery Play in Three Acts (1925)
- The Celebrity: a play in three acts (1926)
- Robina's Web ("The Dovecote", or "The grey feather"): a farce in four acts
- The Night of Feb. 14th 1899 – never produced
- A Russian Vagabond – never produced

== See also ==
- List of ambulance drivers during World War I

== Notes, references and sources ==
=== Sources ===
- Beerbohm, Max (1953). Around Theatres. London: Rupert Hart-Davis. OCLC 432708.
- Connolly, Joseph (1982). Jerome K. Jerome: A Critical Biography. London: Orbis. ISBN 9780856133497.
- Faurot, Ruth Marie (1974). Jerome K. Jerome. New York: Twayne. ISBN 9780805712919.
- Gaye, Freda, ed. (1967). Who's Who in the Theatre (fourteenth ed.). London: Sir Isaac Pitman and Sons. OCLC 5997224.* Jerome, Jerome K. (1983) [1926]. My Life and Times. London: John Murray. ISBN 0719540895.
- Oulton, Carolyn (2012). Below the Fairy City: A Life of Jerome K. Jerome. London: Victorian Secrets. ISBN 978-1-906469-37-5.
- Walkley, A. B. (1892). Playhouse Impressions. London: T. F. Unwin. OCLC 1050799101.
