= Pagani's Restaurant =

Former restaurant in London

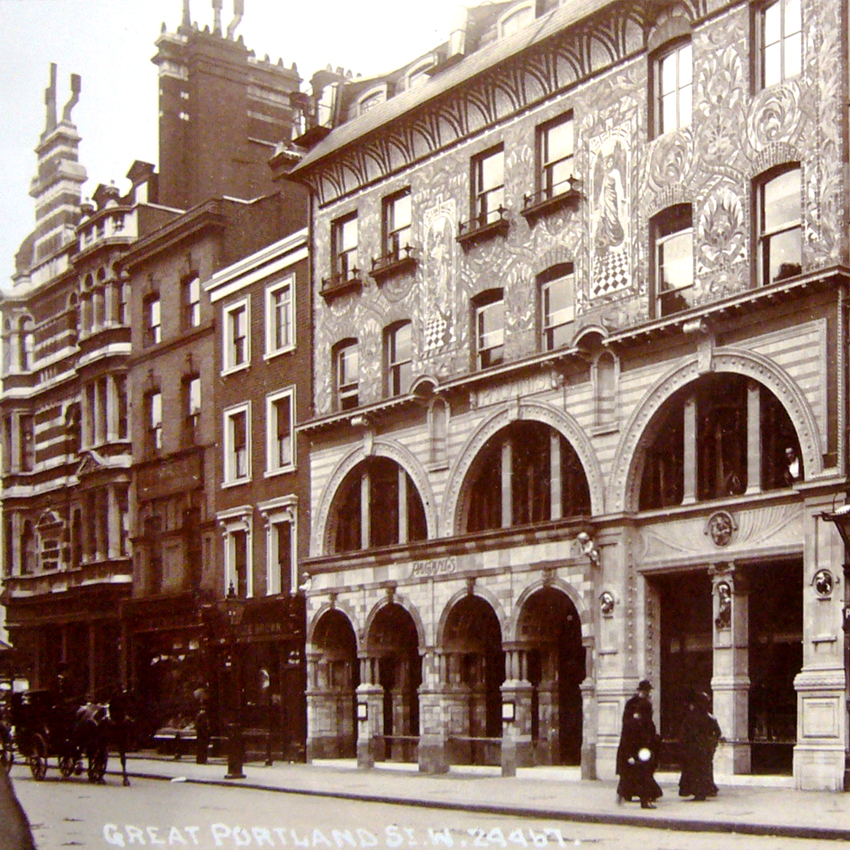
Pagani's Restaurant of Great Portland Street

Pagani's Restaurant was a restaurant located at the site where 40–48 Great Portland Street is now, in the Borough of St. Marylebone, London. It became a favourite gathering place for many artists and musicians before, during and between the wars, closing after it was bombed in the Blitz.

Pagani's began as a small shop (originally at No. 54 Great Portland Street) opened by Mario Pagani, a Swiss-Italian, in 1871. It soon became a restaurant, expanding into the surrounding buildings. Although owned by an Italian the menus were French, as was the custom at the time.

On retirement in 1887 Mario handed over control to his brother, and then (from 1895) to his cousin Giuseppe Pagani. In 1901 Arthur Beresford Pite was contracted to remodel the building's exterior - following on from the deep arcading in coloured terracotta carried out earlier by Charles Worley - and to open up the interior. From 1904 Pagani's partner Arturo Meschini, also a Swiss-Italian, took over as the sole proprietor.

== Artists and musicians ==
The restaurant's proximity to Queen's Hall on Langham Place (opened in 1893) and St George's Hall made it popular with musicians and concert-goers alike. The famous but tiny Artist Room on the second floor had its walls decorated by over 5,000 notes and signatures of many important artists and musicians of the period, including Paderewski, Puccini, Chaminade, Chevalier, Calvé, Piatti, Plançon, De Lucia, Melba, Menpes, Tosti, Sarah Bernhardt and Whistler amongst numerous others. The composer Mascagni added a few bars of music (from Cavalleria rusticana). Five of the panels are now in the London Museum.

Eric Coates recalled that "especially on Symphony Concert days at Queen's Hall, would foregather every musician of note in London at that time". He listed some of the musicians he saw there: John McCormack, Moiseiwitsch, Kreisler, Mark Hambourg, Cyril Scott, Percy Grainger, Norman O'Neill, Roger Quilter, Herman Finck, Edward German, Mengelberg, Eugène Ysaÿe, Arthur Nikisch, Raoul Pugno, Moriz Rosenthal, Mischa Elman, Jacques Thibaud, Alfred Cortot, Casals, Delius, Solomon, Vladimir de Pachmann, Rachmaninoff, Ben Davies, Peter Dawson, Plunckett Greene, Charles Santley and Gervase Elwes. Overseeing "this great and fluctuating family", said Coates, "Mashini, the proprietor and most perfect of hosts...went from table to table followed closely by his little bulldog".

Pagani’s also served as a meeting place for visiting Swiss musicians and ensembles. On 9 March 1937, the William Tell Yodel Choir of Bern performed there at a Swiss Evening organised by the City Swiss Club. The choir appeared in national costume and had performed regularly in England before large audiences. Gritli Wenger accompanied the ensemble and was described as one of the outstanding interpreters of Swiss folklore. The Swiss Minister J. R. Paravicini attended the event.

Poet Philip Bourke Marston's literary circle, which included J. M. Barrie, Algernon Swinburne, Jerome K. Jerome, Coulson Kernahan, and Rudolph Blind, frequented the restaurant in the mid-1880s. According to Jerome, "We dined together once a fortnight in Pagani's first-floor front at the fixed price of two shillings a head, and most of us drank Chianti at one and fourpence the half flask." The group went on to form the Vagabonds Club after Marston's death.

== Closure ==
Pagani's was left ruinous during the Blitz on the evening of 10 May, 1941 in the same bombing raid that destroyed the Queen's Hall. It survived after the war into the 1950s on a much reduced scale, a bar on the lower floor and an excellent restaurant above, run by Arturo Meschini’s wife, Caterina Meschini-Gatti and their children, primarily their older daughter, Rosalinda Meschini-Woodward. The building was demolished and the frontage (one arch only) partially re-constructed in the 1950s.
