= New Vagabonds Club =

English dining club (1894–1912)

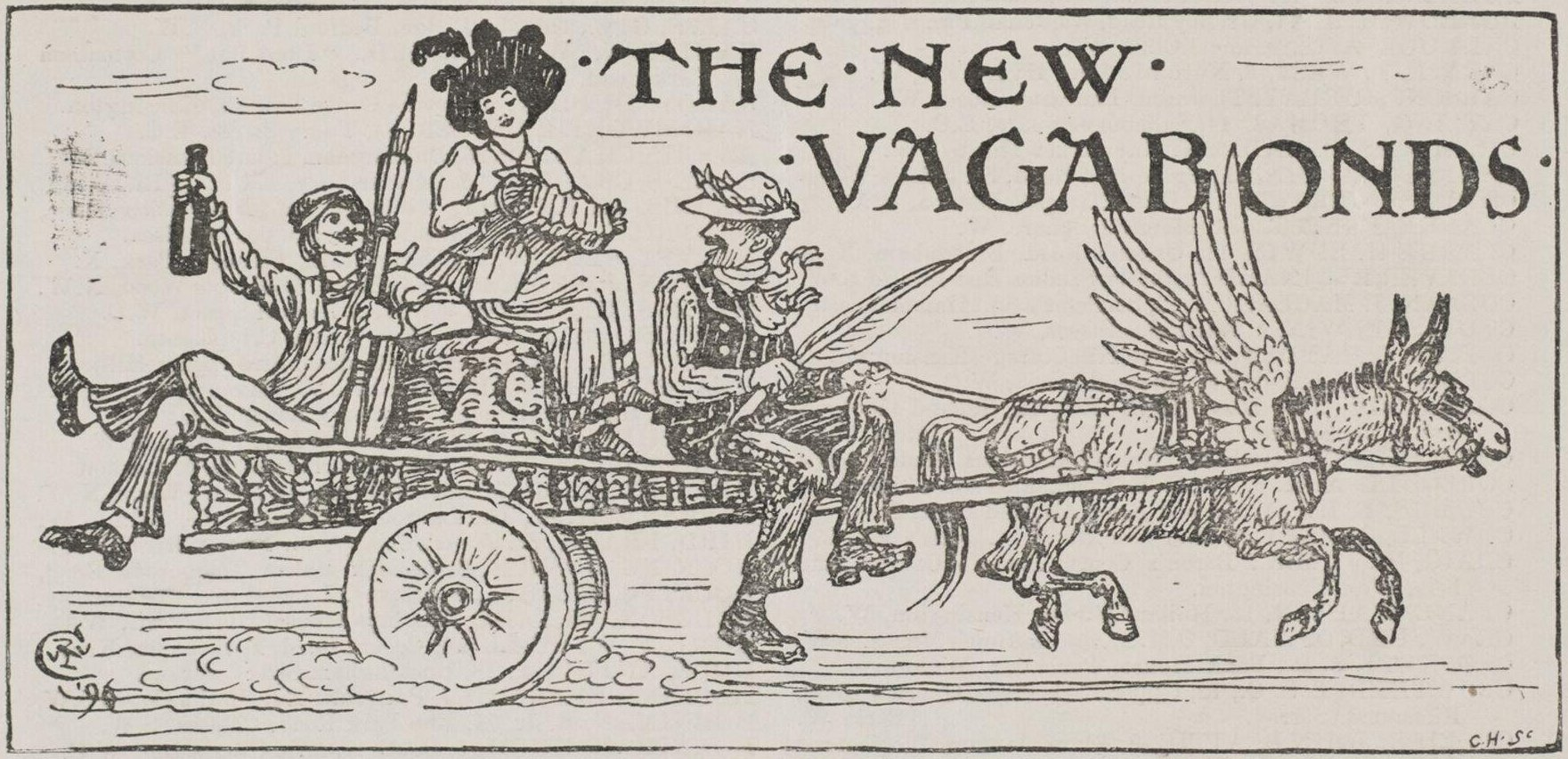
Illustration by Walter Crane for a New Vagabonds Club dinner invitation (5 March 1896)

The New Vagabonds Club (sometimes known as the New Vagabond or New Vagabonds' Club) was a dining club primarily for authors and artists, that met at the Hotel Cecil, London. It began as a group of Philip Bourke Marston's friends, who met at his rooms and Pagani's Restaurant. They formed the Marston Club after his death in 1887, which was renamed the Vagabonds Club as it grew, and was retrospectively known as the Old Vagabonds Club. This was reformed in 1894 by Douglas Sladen as the New Vagabonds Club, which continued until 1912, when it merged into the O. P. Club.

== History ==
=== Precursors ===
The club began as a small circle of authors who met at the home of their friend, the poet Philip Bourke Marston, 191 Euston Road. According to Alfred Moss, they formed around 1883, and "The object of the club was to discuss subjects in connection with literature and the drama. The first 'Vagabonds' were Addison Bright (whose grandfather gave its name to Bright's disease), J. K. J., Coulson Kernahan, Philip Marston, Dr. Westland Marston, Carl Hentschel, and George Wingrave, etc. Pett Ridge joined later." Kernahan said "When [Marston] founded the Club I do not exactly know. I fancy it had only just been started when, at his invitation, I joined in 1886. We dined at Pagani's and then adjourned to his rooms, keeping it up very late." Jerome K. Jerome described the group, saying "We were an odd collection of about a dozen. For a time—until J. M. Barrie and Coulson Kernahan came into it—I was the youngest. We dined together once a fortnight in Pagani's first-floor front at the fixed price of two shillings a head, and most of us drank Chianti at one and fourpence the half flask." Their number also included Algernon Charles Swinburne and Rudolph Blind.

After Marston's death in 1887, Kernahan described how the group "practically ceased as it was [Marston] who ran it. Then I think Herbert Clark proposed that we should continue meeting and call ourselves the Marston Club". The club was formed by a remnant of the original group, and "lots of interesting men came to it. [Marston's] father, Dr. Westland Marston, for one." As the club grew to include people who hadn't known Marston, it was renamed the Vagabonds Club.

Its committee included Jerome, C. N. Williamson, and Frederick William Robinson, with George Brown Burgin as "the original and indefatigable secretary", and members including Arthur Conan Doyle, J. M. Barrie, Israel Zangwill, E. W. Hornung, Solomon Joseph Solomon, Anthony Hope, Hall Caine, Arthur Morrison, Robert Barr, Phil May, Barry Pain, Gilbert Parker, Alfred East, Bernard Partridge, Dudley Hardy, Douglas Sladen, William L. Alden, William Pett Ridge, Walter Jerrold, Coulson Kernahan, Cynicus, Joseph Hatton, Hal Hurst, Rudolph Blind, and Alexander Stuart Boyd. Many of them were contributors to The Idler magazine.

According to Douglas Sladen, it was "a small dining-club, which used to take eighteen-penny dinners at cheap restaurants, and in theory drank beer and smoked clay pipes", and "it was characteristic of the ... Vagabond gatherings to talk shop and do business without any pretence of concealment". Most of its literary members also belonged to the Authors' Club, which was reported to have "more luxurious" dinners than the Vagabonds Club, at which only the guest speakers spoke. In contrast to this, Sladen described the Vagabonds as follows: "I forget if it was a recognised part of the proceedings at the Old Vagabond dinners to have a set subject for discussion. Some one always did get up and make a short speech, and in a club which had men like Jerome and Zangwill and Barry Pain to draw on, the speaking was always witty, unless the subject forbade it. The chief difference was that people did not discuss the speech by getting on their legs to fire witticisms at the speaker. They discussed it where they sat, sometimes talking to each other about it (or anything else), sometimes raising their voices to question the man who had been speaking, or to argue with him. There was much less discussion of the subject than there was talking of shop. The point of the gatherings was that a number of brilliant young authors and artists dined together fraternally once a month." The Vagabonds did not initially admit women as members. According to Jerome "We grew and prospered, dining Cabinet Ministers, Field Marshals—that sort of people—in marble halls. But the spirit of the thing had gone out of it with poor Philip [Marston]."

=== New Vagabonds ===
Kernahan described the Vagabonds Club in its later years as "dropping to pieces for want of some one to work it". Douglas Sladen says "it fell on evil days ... because it contained Socialists, who are apt to wreck things. The course they took was most revolutionary. There were two of them on the committee, and they insisted on having committee meetings, which insisted on having a voice in the management of the Club. The Club would not stand it; it transformed itself into a New Vagabonds Club without the offending members. I took a leading part in the transformation." The Vagabonds Club ceased to exist in summer 1894, and was reconstituted as the New Vagabonds Club in August of the same year, with Sladen and George Brown Burgin as joint secretaries.

It was originally "intended to make the club smaller and much more exclusive, but the meetings will be, as heretofore, once a month", with plans to "make a point of honouring special visitors" at its dinners. Burgin described the members at the time as including "journalists, artists, faddists, misogynists, optimists, pessimists, and novelists of all descriptions".

Sladen "persuaded a hundred well-known men, like Crockett and Weyman and Reginald Cleaver, to join the Club, and we retained the old committee, minus the impossibles, and strengthened by the inclusion of Frankfort Moore and Joe Hatton. And this was a well-behaved committee, because I do not think it met once during its whole existence of not far short of twenty years. Burgin and I were the honorary secretaries and managers, and we used to decide everything, without even thinking of the committee, who, as reformed, had only one idea in their heads, which was that they were not to be bothered unless there was some real necessity for it."

The club's largest dinner had about six hundred people, with Field-Marshall Lord Frederick Roberts as its guest, who had just written Forty-One Years in India (1897). Similar numbers attended the dinners held for Sarah Bernhardt and Henry Irving. Despite Bernhardt's dinner being chaired by then prime minister Arthur Balfour, she arrived three quarters of an hour late. Irving was described by Sladen as "perfectly charming, but when he came to reply to the toast to his health, the audience were confronted by the curious phenomenon that the first actor in Europe was totally unable to make himself heard even half-way across the hall, and if they could have heard what he said, they would have been confronted by the equally curious fact that he was no speaker". Other guests included Winston Churchill, Ernest Shackleton, H. G. Wells, Robert Falcon Scott, George Curzon, Lawrence Alma-Tadema, Ellen Terry, Jerome K. Jerome, Frederic Leighton, Christabel Pankhurst (chaired by Sladen), Ernest Thompson Seton, Herbert Beerbohm Tree, Ian Hamilton (chaired by Cecil Raleigh), C. B. Fry (chaired by Pett Ridge), Mrs Patrick Campbell, George Reid, Richard Seddon, Charles Beresford, Evelyn Wood, Anthony Hope, George Grossmith, Hall Caine, Mary Augusta Ward, Edward Linley Sambourne, Norman Angell, Johnston Forbes-Robertson (chaired by T. P. O'Connor), Douglas Cochrane (soon after his return from the siege of Ladysmith), Mandell Creighton, Edgar Wilson Nye, Flora Annie Steel, Laurence Irving, Gertrude Elliott (chaired by T. P. O'Connor), Robert Barr, H. B. Irving, Arthur Winnington-Ingram, Hedworth Meux, Charles Wyndham, Oscar Asche, James Jebusa Shannon, Lena Ashwell, Violet Vanbrugh, Annie S. Swan, John Oliver Hobbes, Cyril Maude, George Scott Robertson, Arthur Bourchier, Richard Verney (chaired by Jerome), Eustace Miles (chaired by Pett Ridge), William Boyd Carpenter, Lily Brayton, Winifred Emery, William Leonard Courtney, Mary Moore, Edward Ward, Lydia Yavorskaya, and Arthur Diósy, many of which had two, three, or four hundred people in attendance.

The New Vagabonds continued until November 1912, when the joint honorary secretaries Sladen and Burgin decided they were unable to continue running it. Carl Hentschel offered either to take over as honorary secretary, or to merge it into the O. P. Club, which he had set up some time before. As there were already so many similar dining clubs at the time, they decided to merge it. Its final farewell dinner was held at the Connaught Rooms, with the joint honorary secretaries Sladen and Burgin as its guests, and was chaired by Conan Doyle, who "said just exactly the right things to make us feel very proud, and to voice the regret of the Club at meeting for the last time".

== Notable members ==
- Aubrey Beardsley
- Walter Besant (honorary)
- George Brown Burgin (honorary secretary)
- Thomas Catling
- Reginald Cleaver
- James MacLaren Cobban
- S. R. Crockett
- Arthur Diósy
- George Manville Fenn
- George Grossmith
- Bret Harte (honorary)
- Joseph Hatton (committee member)
- Carl Hentschel
- G. A. Henty
- Jerome K. Jerome (committee member)
- Coulson Kernahan
- Hugh Maclaughlan
- Frank Frankfort Moore (committee member)
- Ernest Parke
- Frederick William Robinson (committee member)
- James Jebusa Shannon
- Douglas Sladen (honorary secretary)
- Charles John Tibbits
- Mark Twain (honorary)
- Stanley J. Weyman
- Joseph Gleeson White
