= Great Portland Street =

Street in the West End of London

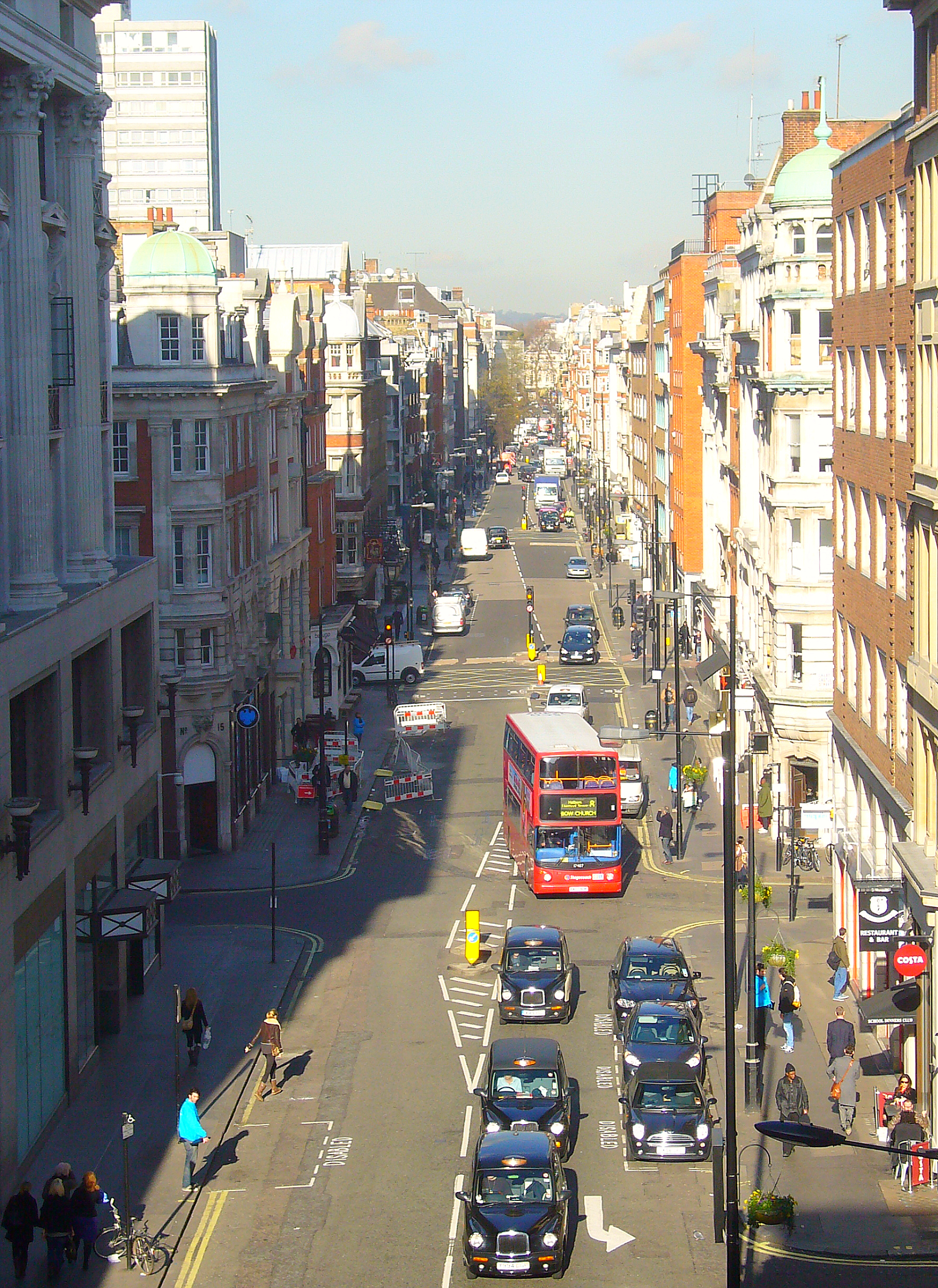
- Great Portland Street, from Oxford Street
- Interactive map of Great Portland Street
- Former name: John Street (1726)
- Length: 0.45 mi (0.72 km)
- Location: City of Westminster, London
- Postal code: W1
- Nearest Tube station: Great Portland Street; Oxford Circus
- Coordinates: 51.5204°N 0.1429°W
- south end: Oxford Street
- north end: Marylebone Road & Euston Road

Great Portland Street is a commercial road in the West End of London which links Oxford Street with the A501 Marylebone Road. A mixed-use street of residents and businesses, it divides Fitzrovia from Marylebone and delineates areas with contrasting identities, with grandiose Portland Place and Harley Street to the west and artists' and independent businesses to the east.

== Overview ==
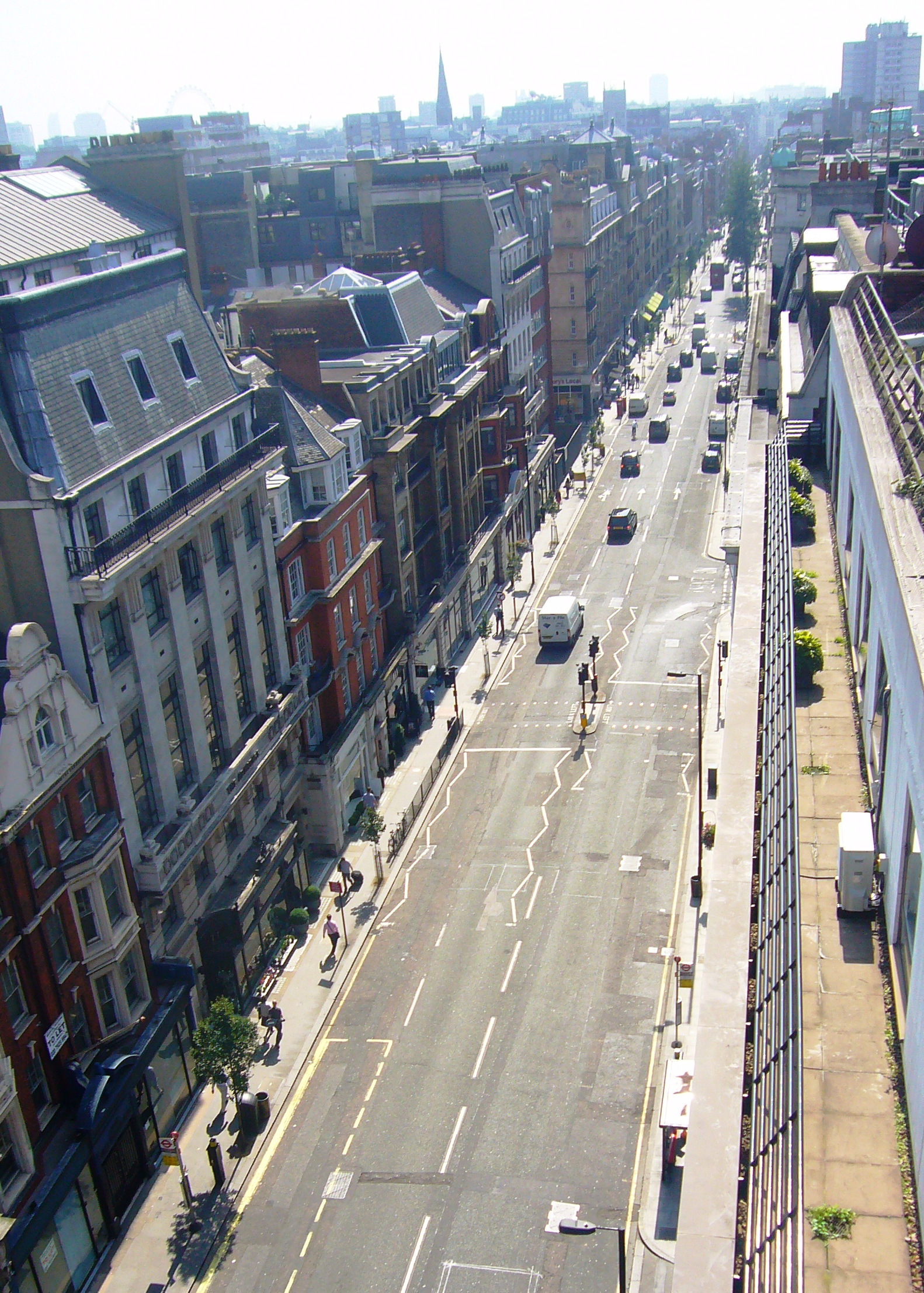
A view south down Great Portland Street from the Marylebone Road

Long sections of Great Portland Street fall in two Westminster City Council conservation areas, named after Harley Street and East Marylebone.

The street was gradually developed by a senior branch of the Cavendish-Bentinck family, the Dukes of Portland, who owned most of the eastern half of Marylebone in the 18th and 19th centuries. It was first rated as John Street in 1726.

Great Portland Street then went on to have some prominence with the arts, the motor, garment and broadcast industries.

A campaign to add to its trees began in 2009.

== Historic influences ==
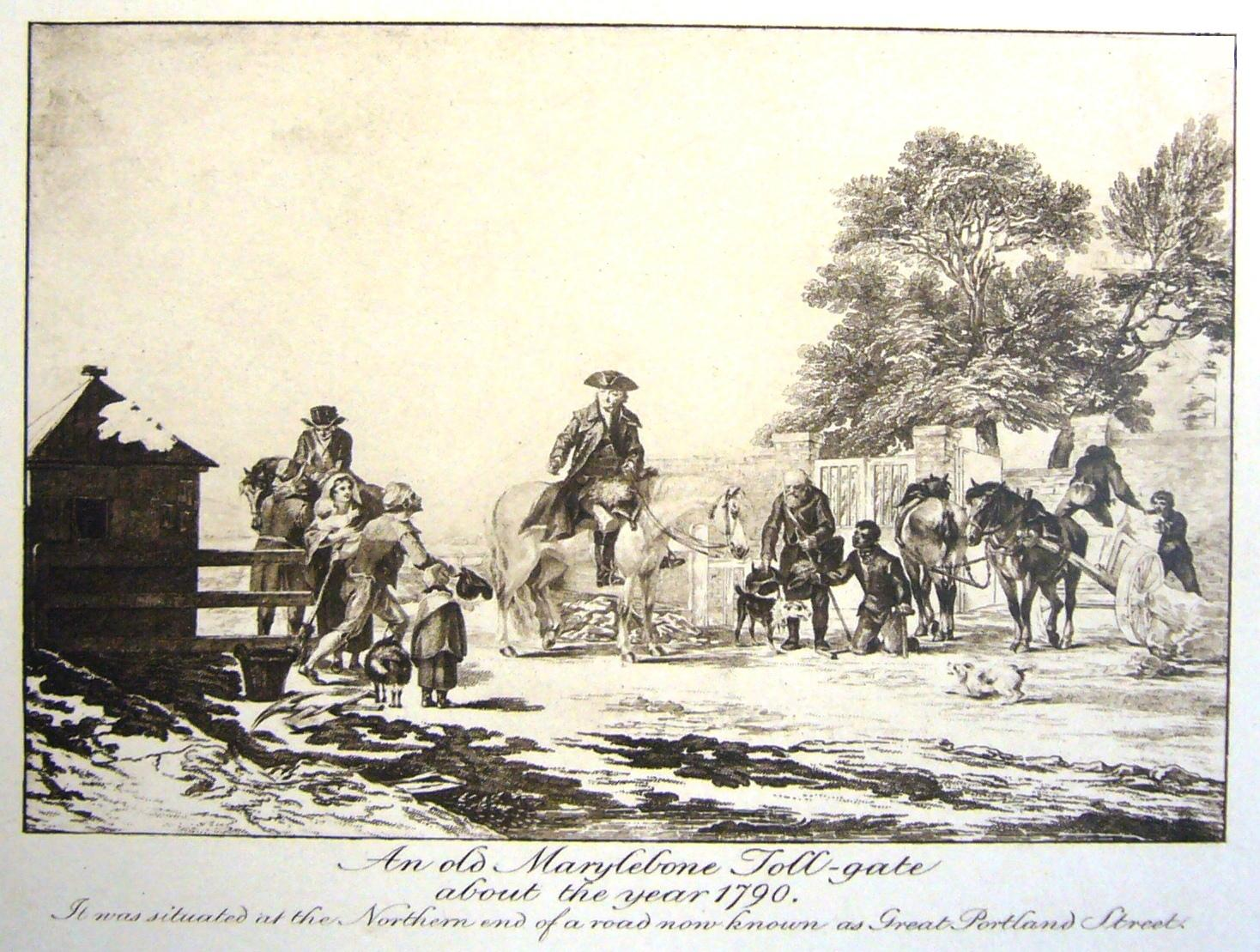
Marylebone Toll Booth on Great Portland Street circa 1790

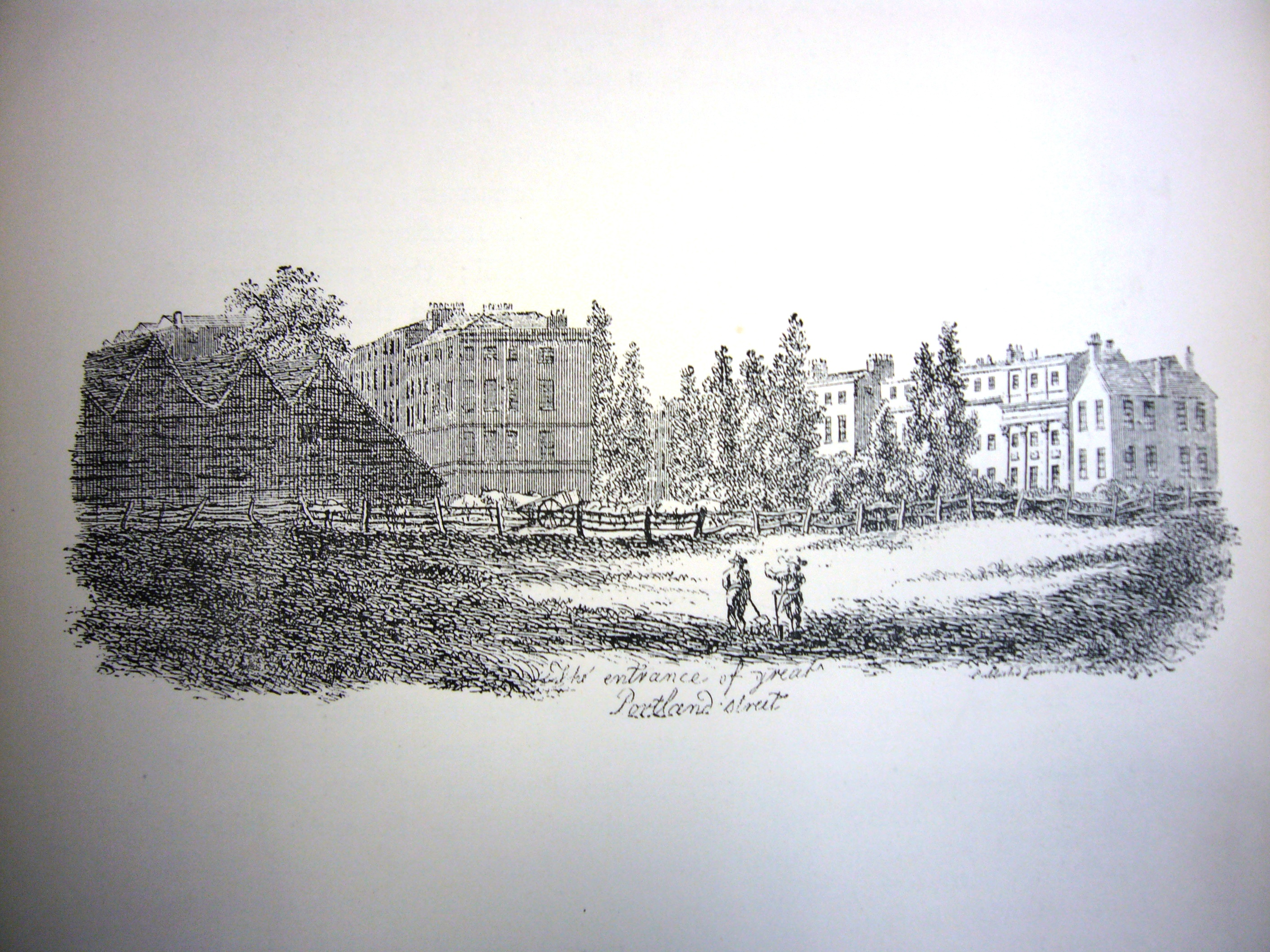
Fields north of Great Portland Street in the late 1700s

Different owners and interests influenced development; these shaped the street's layout and character. Edward Harley – Earl of Oxford and Mortimer, who married Lady Henrietta Cavendish – was responsible for the development of the Portland Estate, building up Cavendish Square in 1717 then the rest of its land to the north and east. Great Portland stresses the descent of the land and buildings through Dukes' successive ownerships. Many local street names reflect their overall ownership, albeit less obviously.

Development up to Great Titchfield Street was through the Portland Estate, competing against adjoining estates. The Berners family owned land to the east; they developed Wells Street and Rathbone Place in the mid-18th century. At the same time the Middlesex Hospital expanded on land on a 99-year lease around Mortimer Street, encroaching on Riding House and Cleveland Streets. These unrelated developers with different designs explains the asymmetrical street grid using the street as a basis; from the street many others start or end.

Great Portland Street runs straight, north-south. The layout, combined with its width and the concentration of shops along its length, means it has for a long time been a local centre and thoroughfare, connecting the residential areas around Regent's Park with the West End. It has also resulted in it becoming a divider, emphasising the contrasting areas to either side. To the east, are artistic areas such as Fitzrovia, which have historically been less well-to-do than the west, with its grand parade of Portland Place, residential areas for the gentry, and doctors and medical institutions on Harley Street.

== Development and redevelopment ==
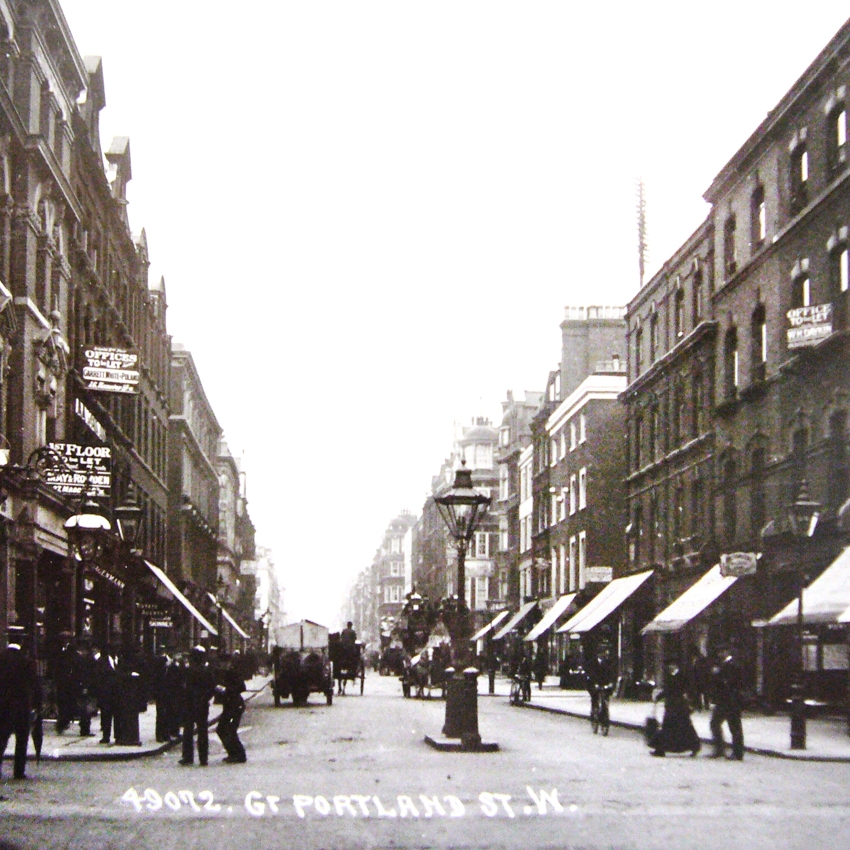
Great Portland Street circa 1905

Development of the estate was gradual but particularly so on Great Portland Street. This had an effect during its redevelopment in the late-19th/early-20th centuries when rebuilding was dictated by the expiration of individual 99-year leases, and is evident in the buildings in existence today.

The most coherent element to the architecture is the predominance of Edwardian buildings to the north and Victorian buildings towards Oxford Street, particularly noticeable when there has been occasional consolidation of plots, leading to consistent façades above street level such as in the block between Clipstone and Carburton Streets. The trend of period groupings is another result of the slowness of the first development. As buildings in the south were built earlier than those in the north, their leases expired earlier, setting off a wave of redevelopment which meant that rebuilding in the south took place in the late-Victorian era, whilst that in the north was delayed until the Edwardian period.

The Blitz made it necessary for further re-building after the war, although the damage incurred along the street was not particularly extensive so there are few modern buildings, and although the aesthetic today is a jumble of architectural styles and eras, the overall feel is that of an historic street.

=== Development over time ===
Maps from close to the outset of building help to identify the street's changes.

==== 1746 (John Rocque's Map) ====
The southern end of Great Portland Street (then shown as Portland Street) has been built as part of the development begun by Edward Harley and Lady Cavendish. With the exception of small villages at Mary Le Bone and Tottenham Court, the rest of the area to the north of Oxford Street is largely open fields. To the south, the street patterns which were the inspiration for the new development of formal squares and streets can be seen in places such as Soho Square.

==== 1793 (Richard Horwood's Map) ====
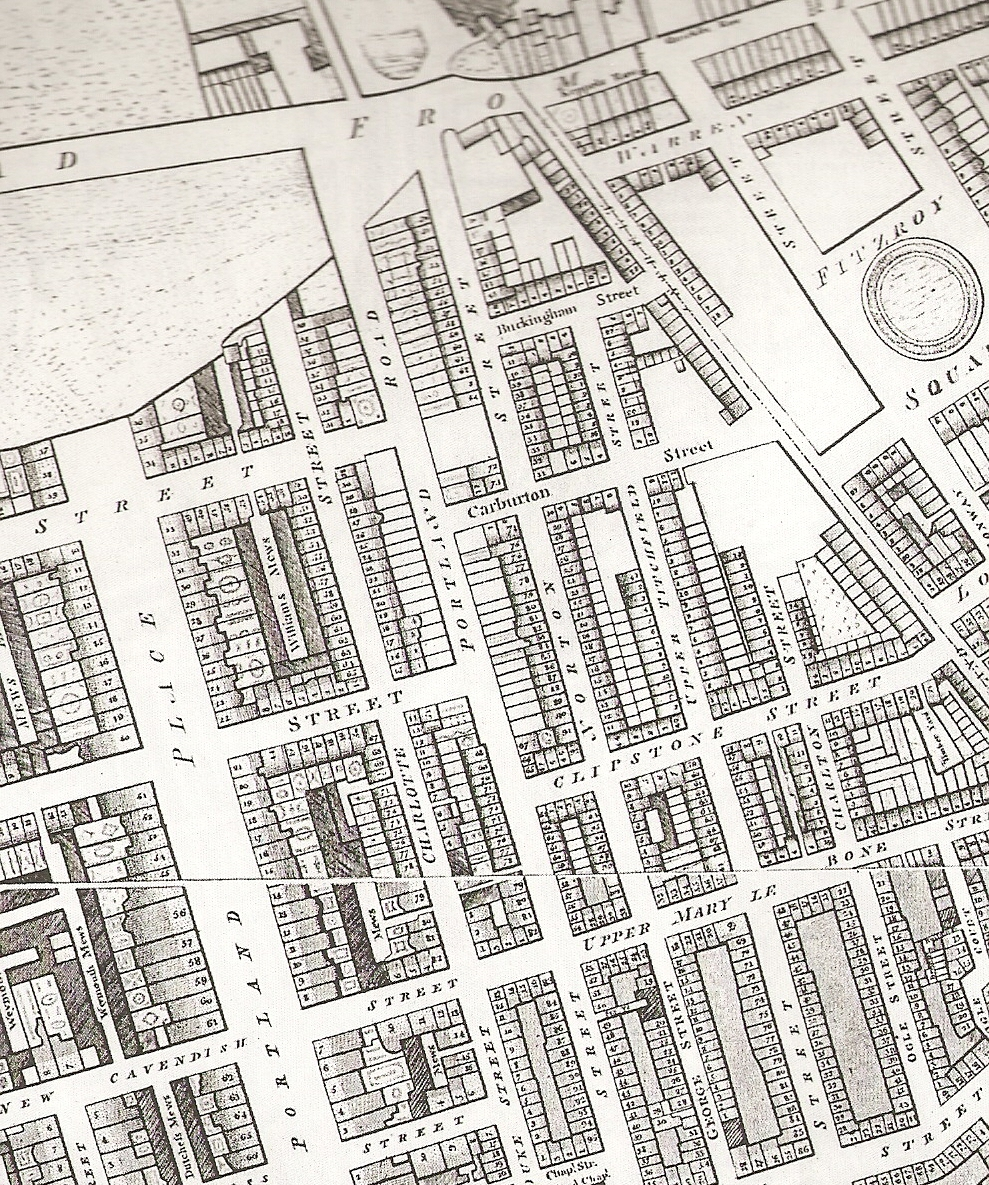
Great Portland Street (then Portland Road) in Horwood's London 1792-9

The street pattern of the whole area has been laid out almost exactly as it is today, with the appearance of Marylebone Road providing the northern boundary to the grid. Notable differences are the presence of Foley House where Langham Place is today, and Portland Place shown in its original design as a close of grand houses. Also, the line of Great Portland Street has been established but the buildings at the northern end have not been built, a curious gap as the streets parallel have largely been built up at this stage. One other curiosity in the planning of Great Portland Street, which still remains today, is its abrupt widening just north of Clipstone Street.

The impetus for the social pattern of affluence to the west and poverty to the east which has long-defined the area has been established with the houses along Portland Place and west of there being much larger than those to the east. These houses, clearly designed for the gentry have their own individual gardens and frequently mews, whilst the houses along Great Portland Street and the surrounding streets are noticeably smaller and would have accommodated the working classes involved in local trades.

==== 1827 (Christopher Greenwood's Map) ====
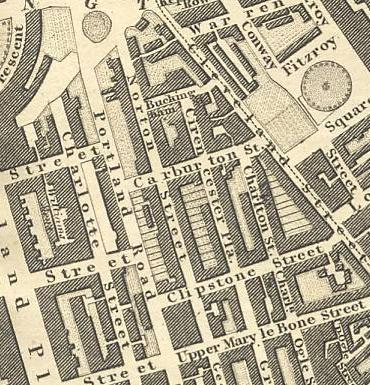
Great Portland Street (still Portland Road) in Greenwood's map of London 1827

Great Portland Street's buildings are still not complete at the northern end, although the rest of the area's present-day street pattern is now completely in place. This includes the appearance of Park Crescent and the transformation of Portland Place into a grand parade with the disappearance of Foley House. These two prominent features were part of Nash's scheme for the Prince Regent when the land to the north was returned to the Crown. This included the laying out of Regent's Park, which had previously remained an area of fields, and the creation of a 'royal mile', beginning at Park Crescent and leading down to Carlton House in the south.

==== 1870 (Ordnance Survey Map) ====
The whole street has been built up and is now united as one street under the name of Great Portland Street whereas previously it had gone by the name of John Street in the few blocks before Oxford Street and Portland Road at the north end. However, the slight widening of the street which used to mark the beginning of Portland Road is still visible at the corner of Weymouth Street. This feature probably would have contributed to the very northern end of the street being more heavily trafficked in comparison to the middle stretch, as is still the case today.

There are signs of the demolition and rebuilding which was beginning to occur in this period and which continued through into the early years of the 20th century. The most noticeable evidence of this on the map is the large gap on the west side between Weymouth and New Cavendish Streets, where the modern synagogue is today. Otherwise, the street pattern and buildings remain largely the same in their layout.

==== 1889 (Booth's Poverty Map) ====
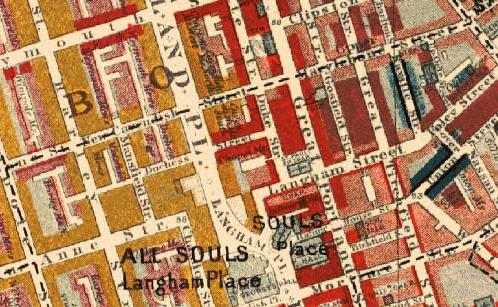
Charles Booth's Poverty Map of London of 1889 showing Great Portland Street

Booth's map shows Great Portland Street and the immediately parallel streets as middle-class/well-to-do whilst the accompanying notes describe it as a "mixed st., shops, restaurants, many curio and antique shops, many doubtful massage establishments". This vibrant description indicates that it is already something of a local centre, with a distinct catchment area made up of those "comfortable" households in the neighbouring streets. The mixed nature of the street described by Booth is not surprising given the general picture this map gives. The movement from 'wealthy' to 'poor' – and even some 'very poor' households – is striking as one travels west to east from Harley Street and Portland Place to Great Titchfield Street and beyond.

==== 1916 (Ordnance Survey Map) ====
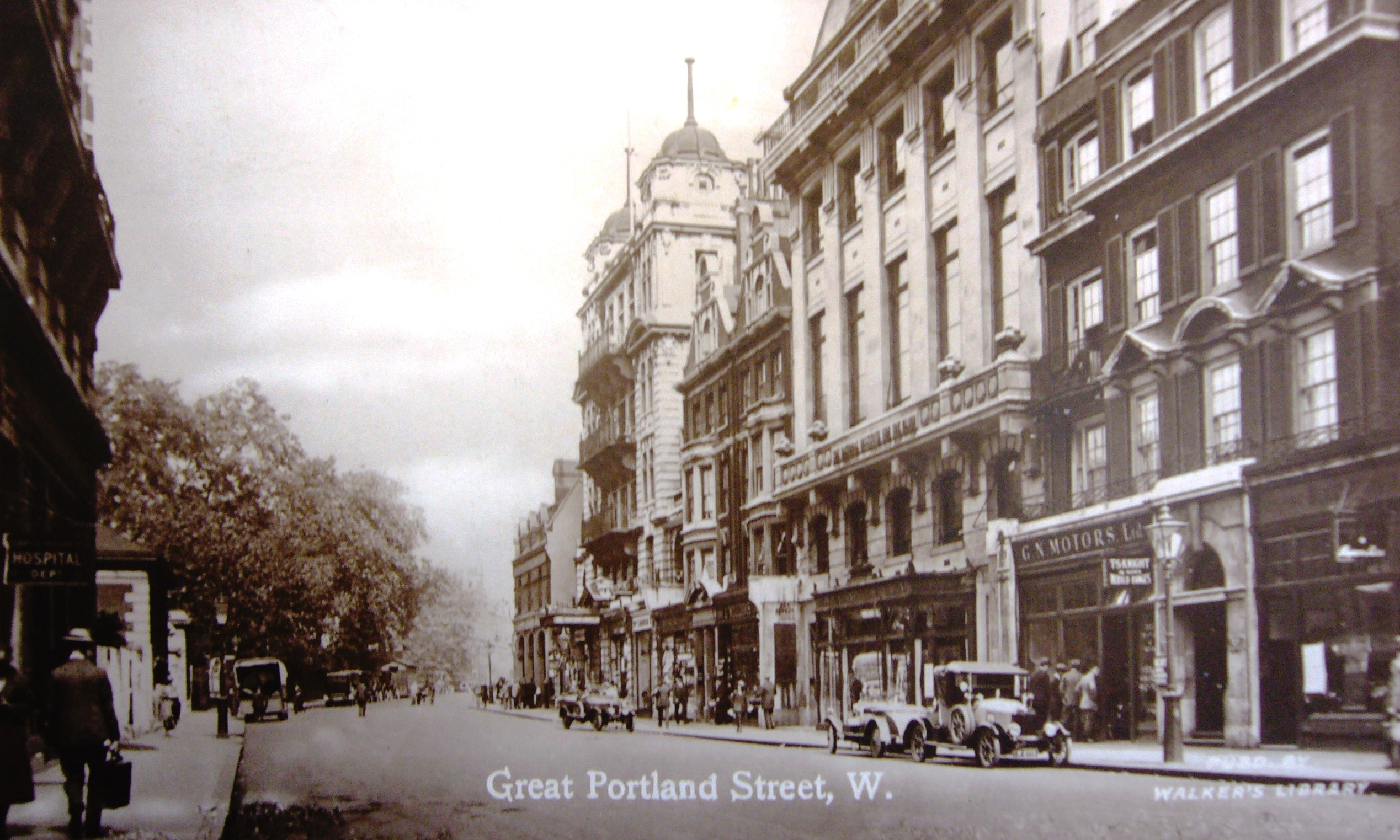
North end of Great Portland Street circa 1910

The great redevelopment of this street has largely come to an end by this time. There are slight changes in some of the plots along the street, showing the further rebuilding and consolidation which had taken place in the previous few decades but otherwise, this street and its surrounding streets remain unchanged in their layout.

==== 1945 (London Council Bomb Damage Maps) ====
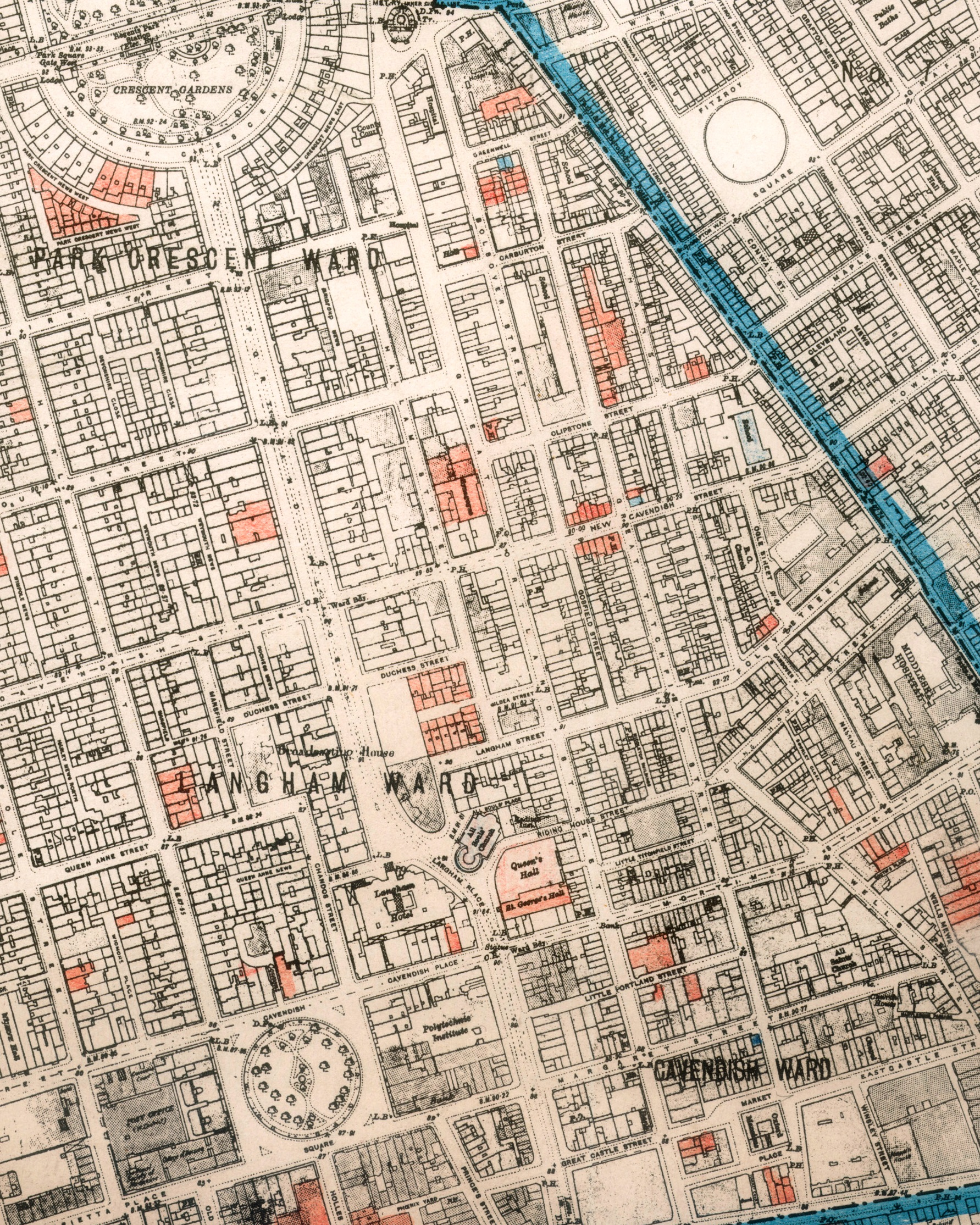
Blitz damage to Eastern Marylebone

A few buildings along Great Portland Street were destroyed by bombing which explains some of the modern developments such as the synagogue opposite Clipstone Street, which was originally built in the late 19th century but damaged beyond repair in the Blitz. The street was cited in 28 separate A.R.P. bomb incident reports dated between September 1940 and 1944. Despite this, much of the street escaped with little or no damage although there was some bad damage nearby in Langham Place and further east around Fitzrovia, with several buildings in those areas being completely destroyed or requiring demolition.

== Broadcasters and media entities ==
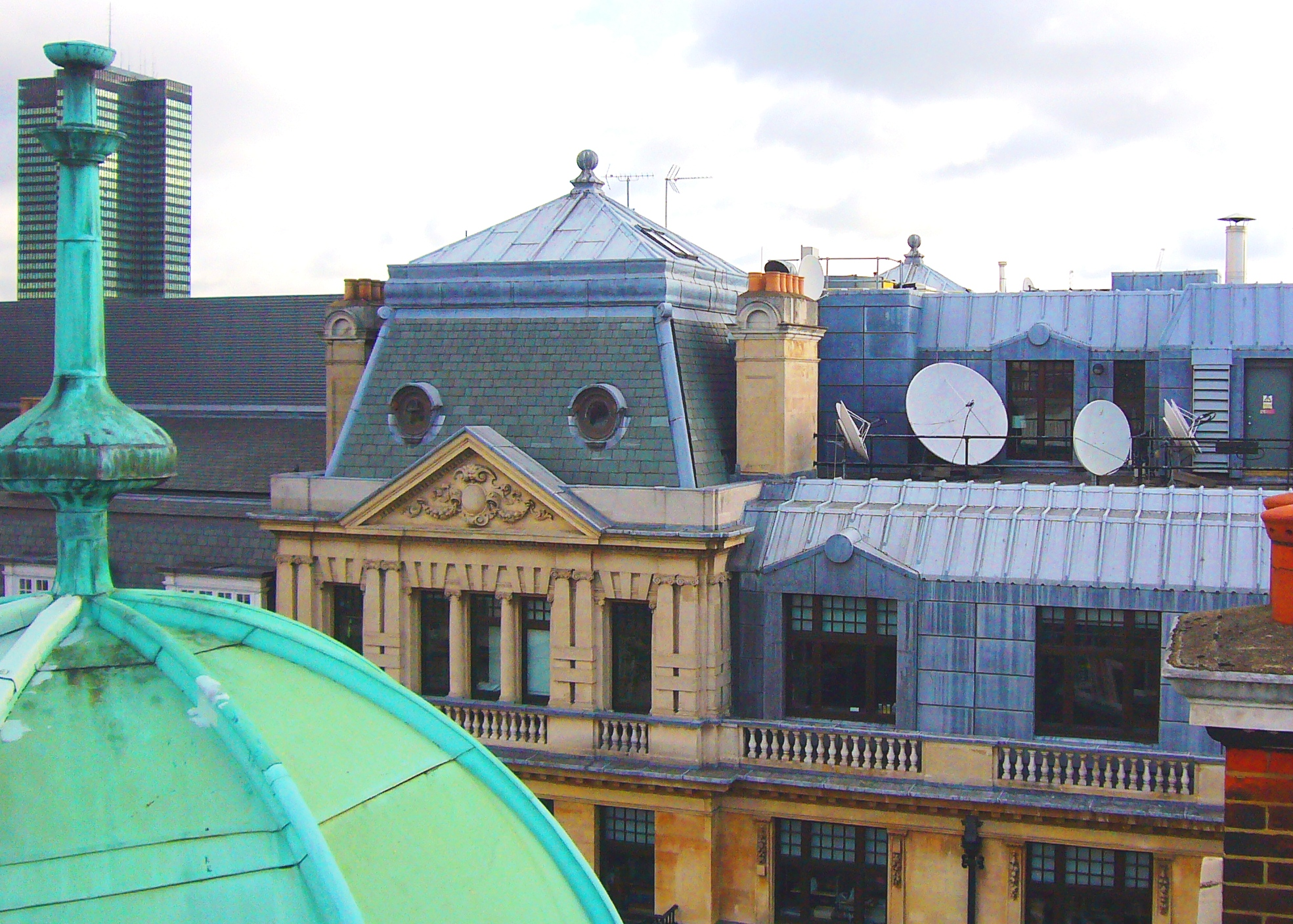
Communications dishes on Great Portland Street roofs

The BBC Trust was based at №180 until 2017 BBC Radio 1's headquarters were also on Great Portland Street in Yalding House until 2012. Similarly, Radio 2 and 6 Music were also on the street at № 99 (Wogan House) until 2024. Virgin Media (including Virgin Mobile) was based at № 160 Great Portland Street, which also at one time housed UKTV, Virgin Media Television and IDS during Virgin's presence on the street. Discovery Channel Europe and Mac 7 TV, among some other TV channels that were also based here. Double Negative (VFX), a British full-service motion picture company, is located on the Great Portland Street.

== Motor cars ==
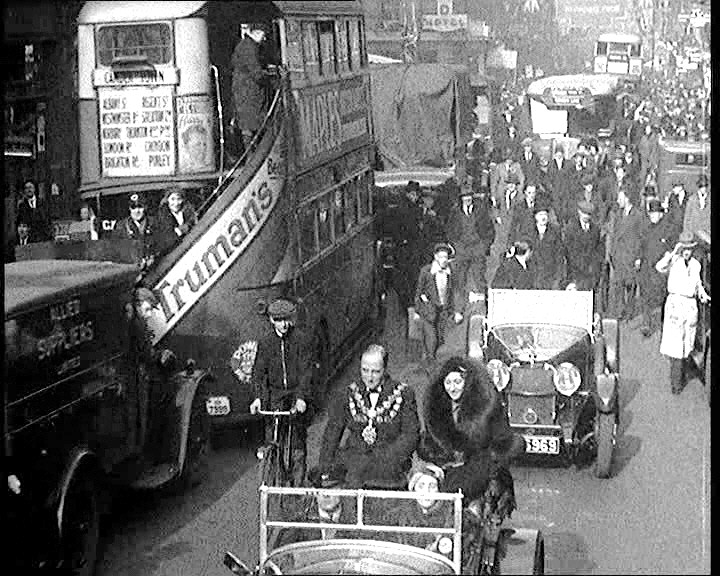
Great Portland Street 'Motor Gala', in 1933

Great Portland Street, also known as "Motor Row", was a primary street for cars and related accessories in the early years of the 20th century. The Benz Motor dealership was located in the very early 20th century on the street at its intersection with Weymouth Street where Villandry Restaurant was located (now Sixes Cricket). By the mid-Twenties Great Portland Street had become a dominant motor vehicle trading venue—with no less than 33 showrooms located along the street. Other manufacturers, including the big names of Vauxhall, Jaguar, Austin, Auto-Union DKW, and the DORT Motor Company were also represented on the street in the first decades of the last century. Other manufacturers with offices and or showrooms on Great Portland Street included Beardmore Motors Limited as well as the Le Zebre, Maxwell, Morgan Motor and Phoenix Car companies. The Indian Motorcycle Company opened its showroom at №s 168-202 in 1908.

Coach builders in Great Portland Street were a crucial prerequisite for the development of the motor trade on the street. They were represented by the Carlton Carriage Co; and well-established firms included light car specialists Mebes & Mebes, founded in 1893 amongst numerous others.

Speedometer House, built in 1913 at №179, was a London motor industry landmark. Its top two floors were devoted to the production of Smiths speedometers, gauges and other instruments, while the basement was given over to the production of carburettors. John Donald "Jack" Barclay, after leaving the Royal Flying Corps at the end of the First World War, set up the Barclay & Wyse partnership at №91 in 1922 to sell Vauxhall automobiles. The head offices of the UK's Retail Motor Industry Federation was located at №201 until 2024.

== The arts ==
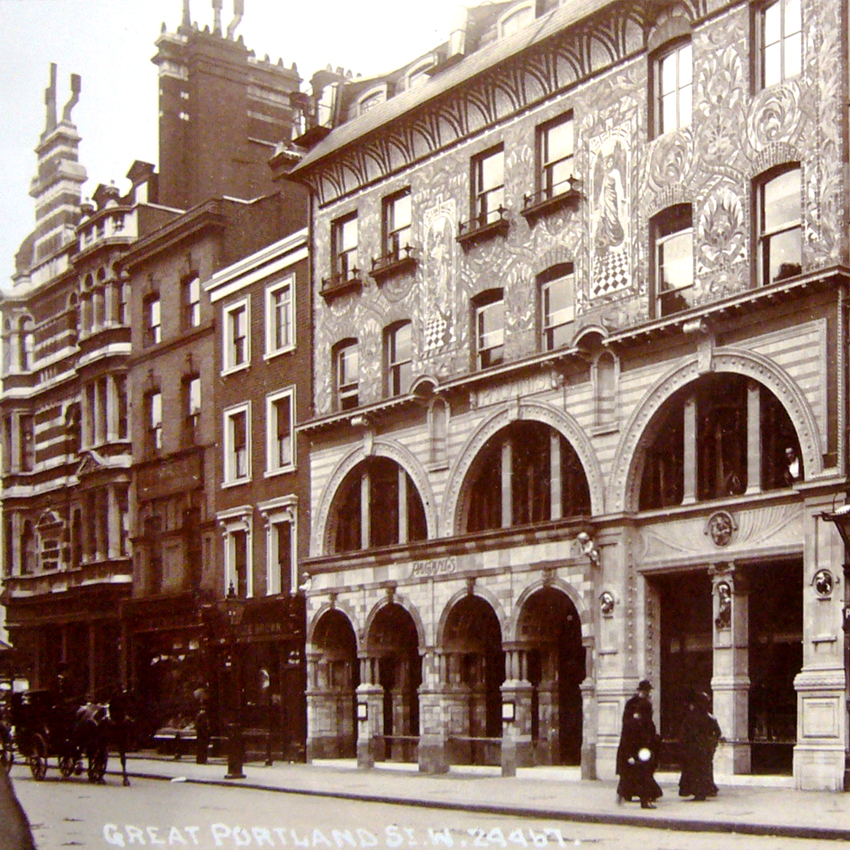
Pagani's Restaurant, and its famous Artists Room, on Great Portland Street

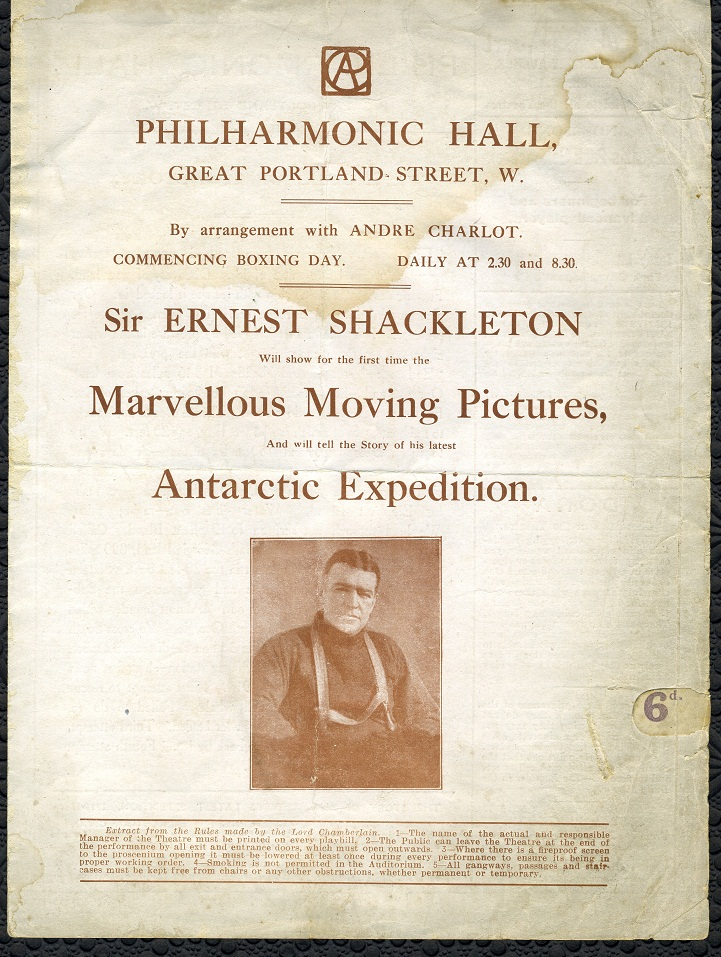
Philharmonic Hall, where Sir Ernest Shackleton presented the film of his Antarctic Expedition

The German composers Felix Mendelssohn (1809–1847) and Carl Maria von Weber (1786–1826) both lived and worked on Great Portland Street. №103 is cited as one of "London's 50 Outstanding Classical Music Landmarks" because Felix Mendelssohn lodged there during the premiere of Fingal's Cave. Other notables living on the street include James Boswell, 9th Laird of Auchinleck, biographer at №122, Leigh Hunt the essayist and poet at №98, and the artist David Wilkie at №117 (1808–09). Sir Charles Barry, the architect, lived at №94 Great Portland Street from 1828 to 1841.

Pagani's Restaurant, with its art nouveau frontage by Beresford Pite, was a favourite gathering place for many artists and musicians. This was perhaps due in part to the restaurant's proximity to Queen's Hall on Langham Place. Its Artist Room walls were decorated by over 5,000 notes and signatures of its many important artists of the period who included Paderewski, Puccini, Chaminade, Chevalier, Calvé, Piatti, Plançon, De Lucia, Melba, Menpes, Tosti, Sarah Bernhardt, Whistler amongst numerous others. Pagani's was bombed during the Blitz but survived for a time after the war. It had first opened in 1871. The Philharmonic Hall was erected on the site of the new St. James Hall on Great Portland Street in 1907. Sir Ernest Shackleton appeared in person there in 1920 when he presented a film of his Imperial Trans-Antarctic Expedition. Some of the artistic and entertainment energy of the area dissipated after Queen's Hall was destroyed by incendiary bombs in May 1941.

== Clothing trade ==
Great Portland Street still hints at its past when it was a major centre for London's women's clothing industry. During the late 1950 and 1960s, garment related businesses could be found all along the length of the street.

The clothing trade took to this street, setting up small stock and workrooms in the early 1900s. Over time, these grew into larger showrooms which represented the English textile industry to many West End stores. The sector's activities were most pronounced where the street intersects with Mortimer Street and Margaret Street. Its proximity to buying officers working for the big stores on Oxford Street gave businesses in the area a competitive edge.

The sector's local presence declined in the late 1970-80s with the disappearance of both the UK's independent retailer and the British textile industry. The growing dominance of UK chain stores, with their requirement for supply chain efficiencies from foreign low-cost suppliers, meant that new orders by-passed the showrooms and manufacturer's agents on the street and its vicinity.

Major names of the garment industry associated with the street include Shubette of London, Coppernob, Alfred Young, Hildebrand and French Connection. The sector is now mainly represented on the street by a few garment importers.

== Buildings and companies ==
The street is split among Westminster Council's Harley Street Conservation and East Marylebone Conservation Areas. The street has a commercial character with a majority of its buildings dating from the late Victorian or Edwardian period. The street has four Grade II listed buildings, the most common category:

- №78/80 - in free Flemish-Jacobean style built in 1904
- №94 (fronts east side) - of the late 18th Century
- №126 (fronts east side) - in free Queen Anne style with Baroque accents built c. 1898
- Great Portland Street Underground Station, W1 - cream, faience tile faced with slate mansard roof - built 1912

Most of the remaining structures on Great Portland Street have been designated as 'Unlisted Buildings of Merit' by Westminster.

Other buildings of note

The Portland Hospital for Women and Children (at first, from 1858, the Ami Portland Hospital for the same), at №s 205-209.

The street has larger Edwardian buildings in the Marylebone Conservation Area such as №s 160-180; №206; and №228 (The Armitage). The latter building was the headquarters of the Royal National Institute of Blind People from 1914 to 2002.

№s45-49 host the Embassy of the Democratic Republic of the Congo.

№229 houses International Students House, London, where the John F. Kennedy memorial bust adorns the lobby.

== Transport ==
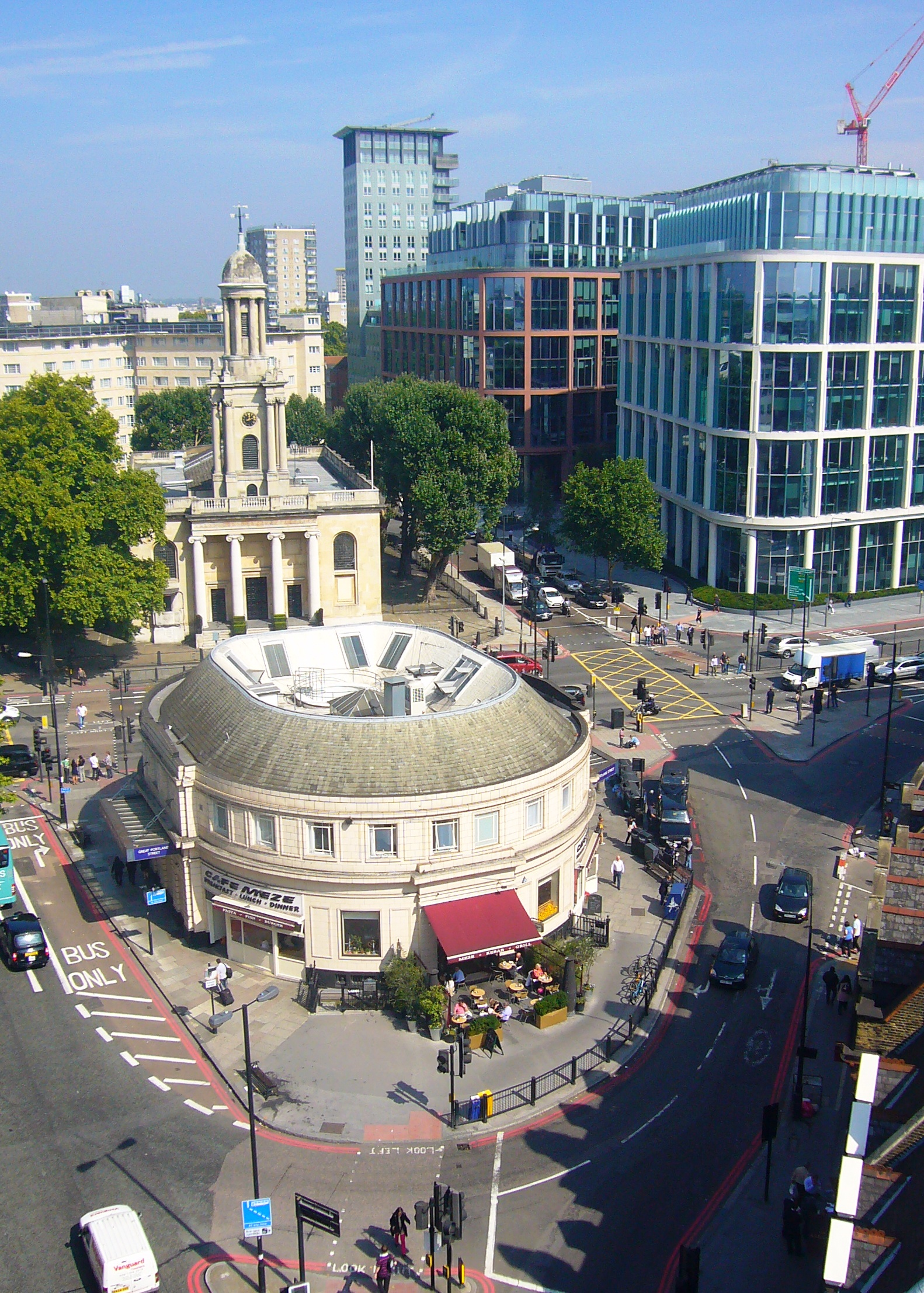
Great Portland Street tube station

The street is served at the northern end by Great Portland Street station and at the southern end by Oxford Circus station.

Great Portland Street station opened as Portland Road on 10 January 1863 as a station on London's then Metropolitan Railway. The station was renamed Great Portland Street in March 1917. The present station building, designed by Charles Clark, is of 1930 date and is constructed from cream faience tile with a slate mansard roof.

Regent's Park tube station is also close to the north end of the street. Buses numbered 88, 18, 27, 30, 205, 189, 3, 12 and 55 stop on or within a close distance of the road.
