= Hotel Cecil, London =

Former grand hotel and RAF headquarters

Coordinates: 51°30′36″N 0°07′18″W

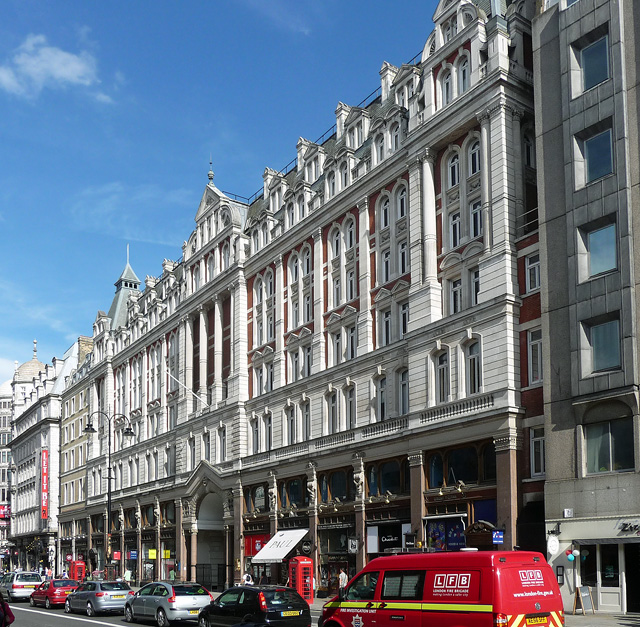
The Strand façade of the Hotel Cecil

The Hotel Cecil was a grand hotel built 1890–1896 between the Thames Embankment and the Strand in London, England. It was named after Cecil House (also known as Salisbury House), a mansion belonging to the Cecil family, which occupied the site in the 17th century. The hotel was largely demolished in 1930, and Shell Mex House, today known as Eighty Strand, constructed on its site.

== History ==
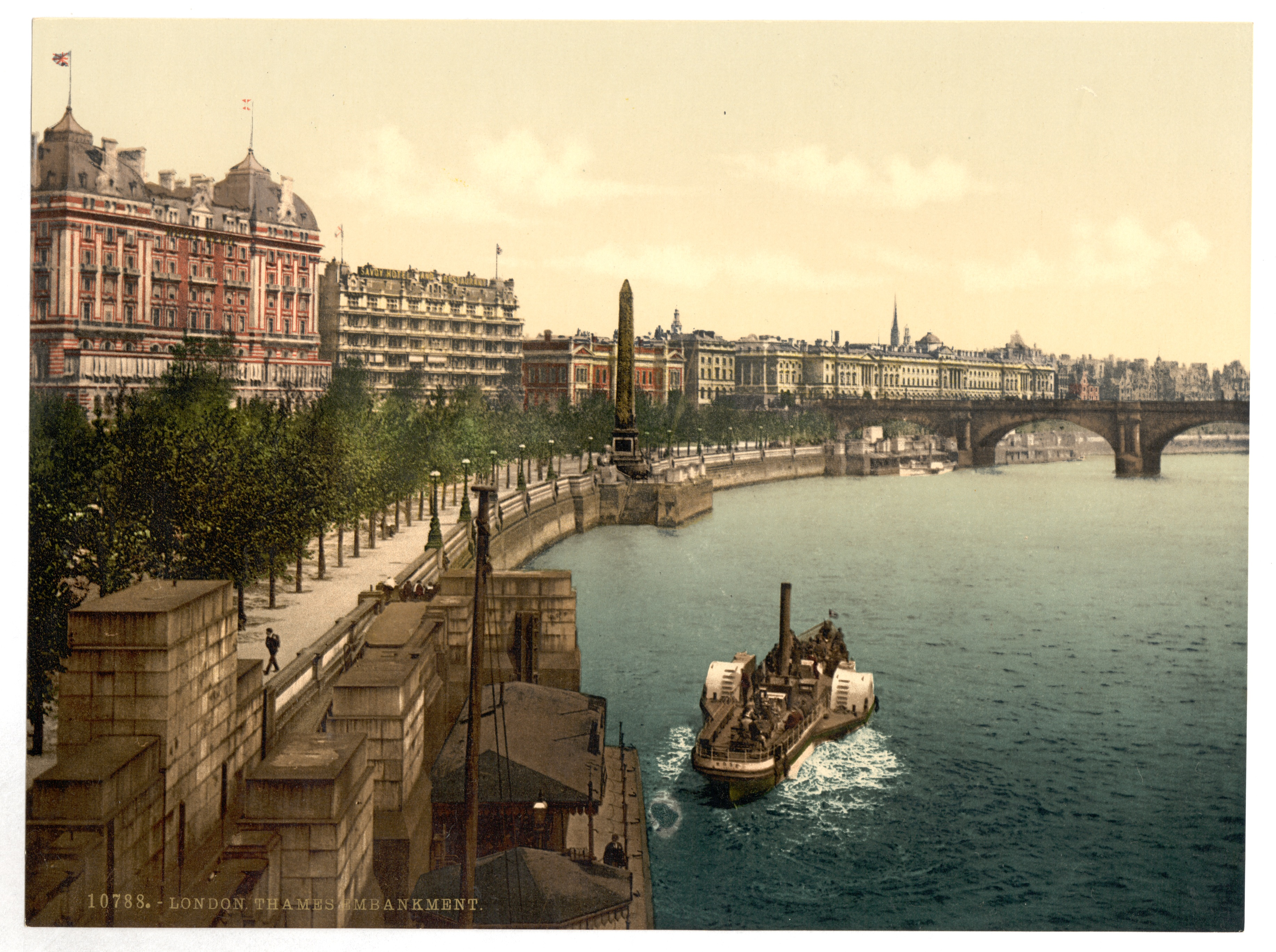
The former river front; the hotel is on the left of the image

Designed by architects Perry & Reed in a "Wrenaissance" style, the hotel was the largest in Europe when it opened, with more than 800 rooms. The proprietor, Jabez Balfour, later went bankrupt and was sentenced to 14 years in prison in 1895.

It served as the venue for the dinners held by the New Vagabonds Club (1894–1912), which were often chaired by Arthur Conan Doyle (and once by then prime minister Arthur Balfour), and had guest speakers such as Winston Churchill, Ernest Shackleton, H. G. Wells, Sarah Bernhardt, Robert Falcon Scott, George Curzon, Henry Irving, and Christabel Pankhurst.

The hotel provided accommodation and the base for Gandhi’s South African delegation campaigning for Indian rights in the Transvaal in 1906.

During World War I, the first of the Sportsmen's Battalions, the 23rd Bn. Royal Fusiliers, was formed in the India Room of the Hotel Cecil in one month, through the efforts of Mrs E. Cunliffe-Owen, daughter of Sir Philip Cunliffe-Owen. A second battalion (the 24th) was formed soon after.

In 1917, the hotel was requisitioned for the war effort by the Air Board, and the first headquarters of the fledgling RAF took up part of the hotel from 1918 to 1919.

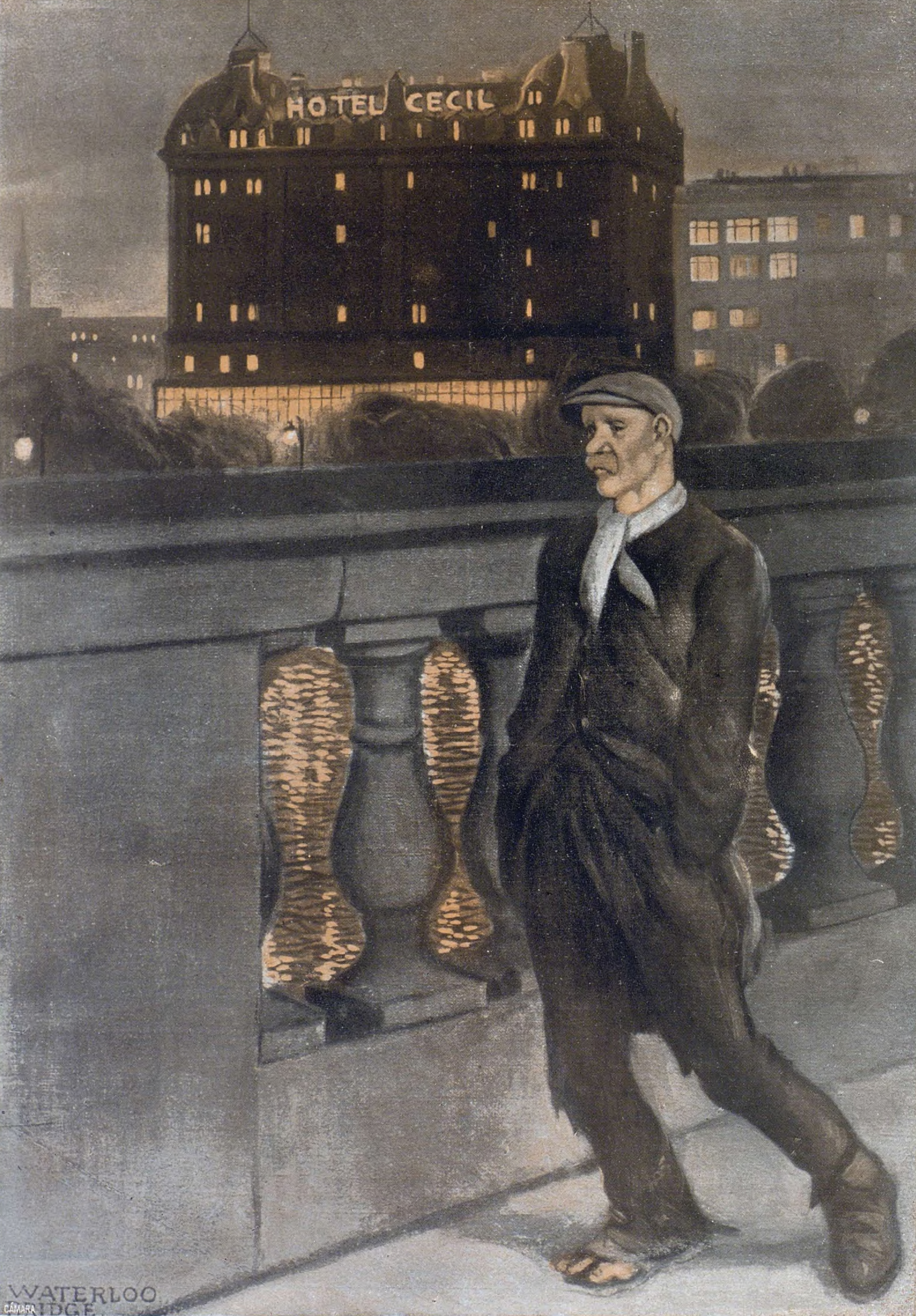
Nightview of Hotel Cecil from Waterloo Bridge by Francisco Sancha (La Esfera, 1914)

Little more than a fortnight after the founding of the RAF on 1 April 1918, the French agent provocateur Bolo Pasha was shot for treason in France on 17 April. He had been attempting in 1916 to destabilise sections of the French press with the intention of forcing an early armistice, using German slush funds channelled via New York, organised by Franz von Papen and the ambassador to Washington, Count von Bernstorff.

"Somehow his name tickled our curiously warped English sense of humour, and the office of the Air Board at the Hotel Cecil was nicknamed the Hotel Bolo, or the Bolo House. The reason given by the inventor of the name was that everybody in the Hotel Bolo was either actively interfering with the progress of the War, or was doing nothing to help its progress. So well was the nickname known that if one wanted to go to the Air Board, or later on to the Air Ministry, one merely told the taxi-driver to go to the Hotel Bolo, or the Bolo House, and he went without further question."

"Bolo" was also a slang term given to a Bolshevik, especially from 1919 when a number of RAF units were engaged in the North Russia intervention.

In March 2008, a green plaque was placed just inside the outer Strand entrance to the building, proclaiming: "The Royal Air Force was formed and had its first headquarters here in the former Hotel Cecil 1 April 1918". Below it is a brass plate stating: "This plaque was unveiled by the Chief of the Air Staff Air Chief Marshal Sir Glenn Torpy to mark the 90th anniversary of the formation of the Royal Air Force".

The hotel was the base for a Palestine Arab delegation that arrived in London in August 1921 and spent almost a year there, protesting in vain against the proposed terms of the British Mandate for Palestine. The president of the delegation was Musa Kazim al-Husseini; its secretary was Shibli al-Jamal; the other delegates were Tawfiq Hammad, Amin al-Tamimi, Ibrahim Shammas and Mu'in al-Madi; the assistant secretary was Dr Fu'ad Samad.

The Cecil was largely demolished in Autumn 1930, and Shell Mex House was built on the site. The Strand facade of the hotel remains (now occupied by shops and offices, including those of Interbrand), with, at its centre, a grandiose arch leading to the separate Shell Mex House behind. After Shell Mex relocated, the block became known as 80 Strand and is occupied by a number of companies, including AIMIA and Pearson PLC subsidiaries Financial Times, Penguin Books, Dorling Kindersley and Rough Guides.
