= Japan Society North West =

- Formation: 2004
- Type: Bilateral relations organisation
- Purpose: Promote Japan–United Kingdom relations
- Location: Northwest England
- Official language: English; Japanese
- Website: jsnw.org.uk

The Japan Society North West (JSNW) is a non-profit organisation based in northwest England. Formed in 2004, it aims to promote Japanese culture and Japan–United Kingdom relations.

The JSNW grew out of the original UK Japan Society of the North West, which was founded in 1996 to provide a focus for local companies with business interests in Japan. This organisation was eventually dissolved, and many of its former members formed the JSNW in May 2004.

The JSNW organised a Japan Day at Manchester Town Hall in 2006, which was opened by the Ambassador of Japan to the United Kingdom Yoshiji Nogami and the Lord Mayor of Manchester David Sandiford. It has since organised and hosted multiple annual events around northwest England.

== See also ==
- Japan Society of London
