= Carl Hentschel =

British artist and inventor

- Born: 27 March 1864; Łódź
- Died: 9 January 1930 (aged 65); London
- Occupations: Artist, businessperson, printer
- Known for: Inventing the Hentschel colourtype process

Carl Hentschel (27 March 1864 – 9 January 1930) was a British artist, photographer, printmaker, inventor and businessperson. He developed techniques for printing illustrations, particularly the Hentschel Colourtype Process using three colours, which have been described as "revolutionising" newspaper illustration. He was the original of "Harris" in Jerome K. Jerome's Three Men in a Boat (1889).

== Early life ==
Hentschel was born in Łódź, now in Poland, then part of the Russian Empire, on 27 March 1864. He was the son of August Hentschel, who was an engraver, and Olga.

The family emigrated to Britain when Carl was five. His obituary in The Times says that he "had some education at Eastbourne, where his father then had a paper collar factory". He was apprenticed to his father at 14. He wrote that "My first experience in producing illustrations was in assisting my father in photographing drawings on wood". His father had invented this technique, and later invented a process of printing on zinc, based on the Gillot process.

== Career ==
The speed of some of Hentschel's own early work was unusual; in 1900 he said "when I succeeded in turning out a block in twenty-four hours, it was specially noticed in the Press". He also describes the length of time allowed for some projects: "I can call to mind in 1879 having some very difficult old engravings to reproduce; they were for a book on Marie Antoinette, by Lord Ronald Gower, and it took the best part of a year to do what now could be done in a week".

Hentschel was the inventor of the colour type process named after him; The Times wrote that he "made the first process block, which brought about a revolution in newspaper illustration". He established his company, Carl Hentschel Co., in 1887. In 1899 he founded a second one, Carl Hentschel Colourtype Company, which used a three-colour printing technique. The company printed Beatrix Potter's The Tale of Peter Rabbit using this technique in 1902.

Carl Hentschel Co. was described as "the leading firm engaged in line-process work in this country". The firm was located at 182-184 Fleet Street.

The poet and artist Isaac Rosenberg was apprenticed there in 1905. He was unhappy there; in 1909 he was working long hours, until 11pm, and earning 30 to 35 shillings a week, and was sacked in 1911.

Henschel's work included illustrations for Aubrey Beardsley and Oscar Wilde, notably Wilde's Salome (1894). The critic Nick Frankel has referred to "the triangle of friendship and collaboration between Hentschel, Wilde and Beardsley". Another important production was an illustrated book about the Slade School of Fine Art, published in 1907.

The Printing World noted in 1902 that "for two recent numbers of the Lady's Pictorial and one of the Lady Mr. Hentschel finished and delivered sixty-five large pages of reproduction from pen-and-ink drawings in three days - about the smartest bit of work ever done". The Sketch in 1906 said that the company "contracts to supply urgent engravings in A FEW HOURS from the delivery of the originals".

He has been described as "revolutionising the means of newspaper illustration" and "having done more than any one else in England to perfect line-block technology". His work is used in the 1895 book Modern Illustration, by Joseph Pennell.

In 1915, during the First World War, it was reported that the firm had lost business because people had assumed from its name that it was a German company.

As a photographer, Hentschel won a gold medal at the Paris Exhibition of 1900.

== Friendship with Jerome K. Jerome ==
Hentschel met Jerome K. Jerome and Jerome's friend George Wingrave at the theatre. They were two of the original members of the literary circle set up by poet Philip Bourke Marston around 1883, which went on to become the Vagabonds Club. Jerome based "Harris" in Three Men in a Boat on Hentschel.

Jerome wrote:

Harris was Carl Hentschel. I met him first outside a pit door. His father introduced photo-etching into England. It enabled newspapers to print pictures, and altered the whole character of journalism. The process was a secret then. Young Carl and his father, locking the back kitchen door, and drawing down the blind, would stir their crucibles far on into the night. Carl worked the business up into a big concern; and we thought he was going to end as Lord Mayor. The war brought him low. He was accused of being a German. As a matter of fact he was a Pole. But his trade rivals had got their chance, and took it.

— Jerome K. Jerome, My Life and Times (1926)

Hentschel himself said of the trips which became Three Men in a Boat,

Jerome at that time was in a solicitor’s office in Cecil Street, where the Hotel Cecil now stands, George Wingrave was a junior clerk in a bank in the City, and I was working in a top studio in Windmill Street, close to where the Lyric Theatre now stands, having to look after a lot of Communists, who had had to leave Paris. Our one recreation was week-ending on the river. It was roughing it in a manner which would hardly appeal to us now. Jerome and Wingrave used to live in Tavistock Place, now pulled down, and that was our starting-point to Waterloo and thence to the river. It says much for our general harmony that, during the years we spent together in such cramped confinement, we never fell out, metaphorically or literally.

— Douglas Sladen, Twenty Years of My Life (1915)

Although Harris is shown as frequently drinking alcohol, in real life Hentschel was the only one of the three friends who didn't drink.

== Personal life and interests ==
Hentschel's Times obituary reports that "He married, in 1889, Bertha, a daughter of Mr. David Posener, and he used to say that this was the cleverest thing he ever did, for her help and sympathy alone enabled him to come through his early struggles." Their children included Irene Hentschel (1891–1979), theatre director and the first woman to direct Shakespeare at the Stratford-upon-Avon Shakespeare Festival, and Christopher Carl Hentschel (born 1899), a university lecturer in zoology.

The newspaper editor GB Burgin described him as "the indefatigable Carl Hentschel ... possessed of more persuasive and pervasive dynamic force than any man I have ever met".

Hentschel was a theatre-goer, and said that he had attended almost every London first night. He was one of the founders of the Playgoers' Club in 1883. He broke away from the club in 1900 and formed the Old Playgoers' or O.P. Club. He and Mandell also started a periodical, the Playgoer, but the Times says that "it did not live long". He also edited a periodical called Newspaper illustration.

Hentschel was active in public life, particularly in the City of London. He was on the Court of Common Council between 1901 and 1921; the ward he represented was Farringdon Without. He campaigned for issues including ceasing the practice that aldermen were elected for life, and limiting speeches. His public roles included Chair of the Guildhall School of Music and President of the City of London's Tradesmens' Club. During the First World War he was secretary of the Optimists Corps.

Hentschel was a supporter of women's suffrage, advertised his firm in the suffrage magazine The Common Cause and printed cards and a calendar for the Artists' Suffrage League. His wife, Bertha Hentschel, was active in the suffrage movement, and in 1910 proposed that a new Women's Suffrage Society was formed. Hentschel wrote to The Times in 1908 protesting against the treatment of women suffragists.
