= The Japan Society of the UK =

The Japan Society of London
- Formation: 1891
- Founder: Arthur Diósy
- Type: Bilateral relations organisation
- Purpose: Promote good relations between Japan and the UK
- Location: London, Japan
- Region served: Japan, UK
- Official language: English, Japanese
- Website: www.japansociety.org.uk

The Japan Society of the United Kingdom, founded in 1891, is an organisation that fosters relations between Britain and Japan. It is the oldest organisation dedicated to intercultural understanding and positive relations between a European country and Japan. It has also been known as the Japan Society of London and is often referred to simply as the Japan Society.

== History ==
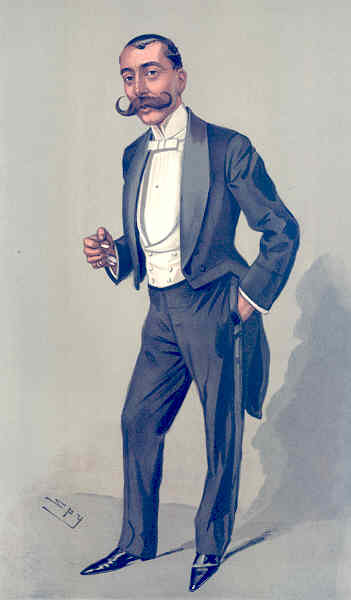
A caricature (by Spy) of Arthur Diosy, founder of the Japan Society of London.

The Society grew out of a meeting of the International Congress of Orientalists held in London on 9 September 1891, when a resolution was passed calling for the formation of a society "for the encouragement of Japanese studies and for the purpose of bringing together all those in the United Kingdom and throughout the world who are interested in Japanese matters".

The Society's founder, Arthur Diosy (1856–1923), spoke fluent Japanese and wrote several books, including The New Far East.

== Membership ==
The Society reports that it has more than 1,000 individual and corporate members, 45 per cent of them Japanese.

== Merger ==
In October 2007 the charity Japan 21 merged into the Society, which took over its educational and grassroots activities relating to Japan alongside the Society's existing business-related, academic and cultural activities.

== Publications ==
From 1892 to 1941 the Society published

- "Transactions and Proceedings". Japan Society. London.*"Proceedings". Japan Society. London. ISSN 0952-2050.

From 1957 to 1985 it published

- "Bulletin". Japan Society of London. ISSN 0021-4701.

== See also ==
- Japan–United Kingdom relations
- Japan Society North West
- Hugh Cortazzi
- The Japan–British Society
- Joseph Henry Longford - Vice-President in 1922
- Walter Weston
