= Mortimer Menpes =

English painter

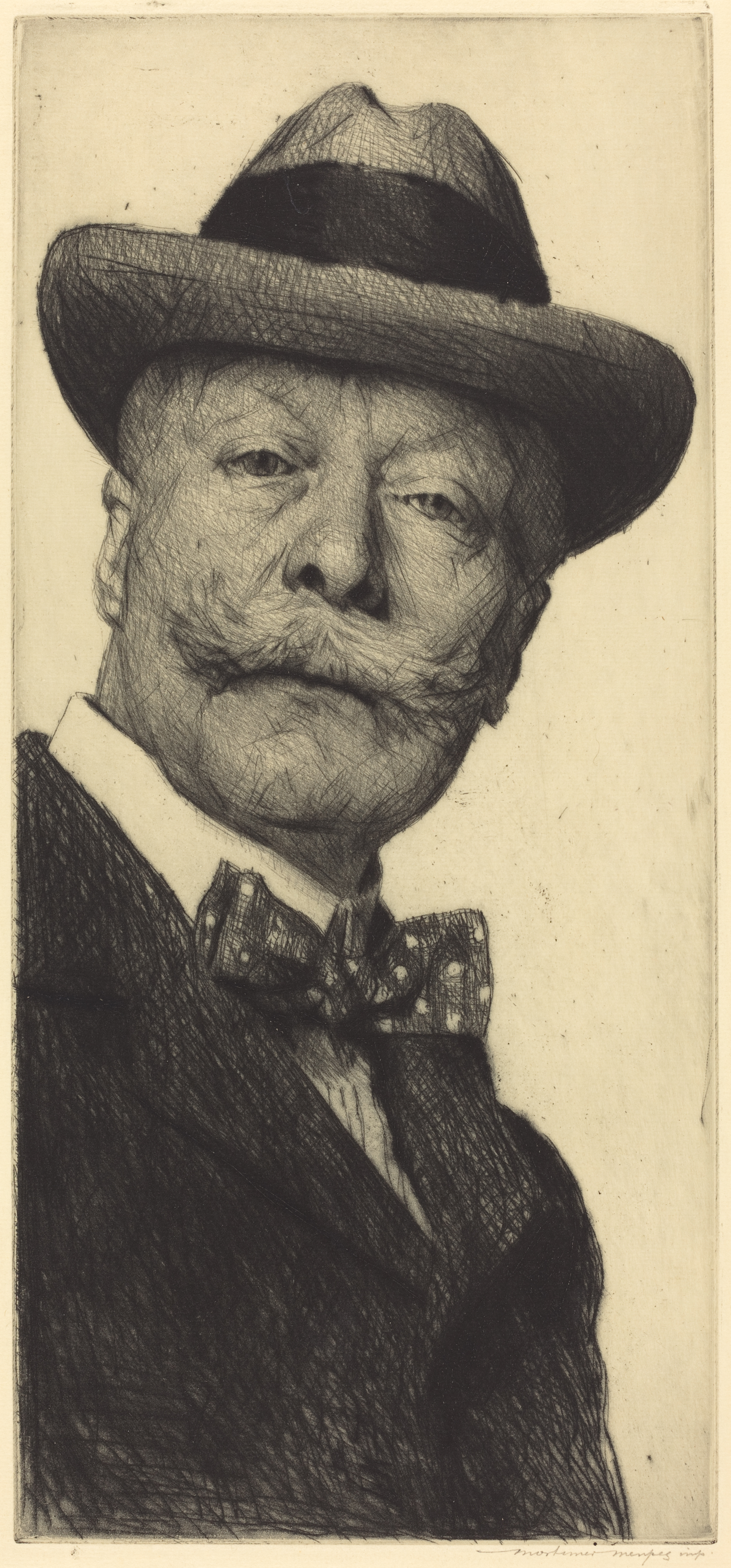
- Self-portrait, c. 1916
- Born: 22 February 1855; Port Adelaide, South Australia
- Died: 1 April 1938 (aged 83); Pangbourne, Berkshire, England
- Occupation: Artist
- Spouse: Rosa Mary Grosse (m. 1875)

Mortimer Luddington Menpes (22 February 1855 – 1 April 1938) was an Australian-born painter, author, printmaker and illustrator.

Born and raised in Port Adelaide, South Australia, Menpes migrated with his family to London, England in his early 20s, where he went on to study at the School of Art and exhibit at the Royal Academy. In 1880, during a sketching tour in Brittany, he befriended, and became a "disciple" of James McNeill Whistler. Under his influence, Menpes began incorporating motifs and techniques of Japanese art into his work, and in 1887, he travelled to Japan to witness its culture first-hand. He produced many Japonist works while there, which he exhibited back in London in 1888 at his first solo show. It proved to be a critical and commercial success, encouraging Menpes to travel further abroad for artistic inspiration, and over the next two decades he went to India, China, Kashmir, and Myanmar, among other countries. He also went to South Africa as a war artist during the Boer War.

A "born raconteur", Menpes was a fixture of British high society, and he became renowned for hosting soirées at his Japanese-style home on Cadogan Gardens, attended by a wide circle of artists, writers, socialites and other prominent figures. He was the godfather of Oscar Wilde's son Vyvyan.

== Life ==
Menpes was born in Port Adelaide, South Australia, the second son of property developer James Menpes (1 August 1818 – 7 December 1906), who with his wife Ann, née Smith, arrived in South Australia from London on the Moffatt in December 1839. Despite losing much property in a great fire of 1857, James Menpes prospered, building commodious shops on St. Vincent Street, Port Adelaide and housing, "Cypress Terrace", on Wakefield Street, Adelaide. James retired from business in 1866 and returned to England with his wife, sons Mortimer and James Henry and two daughters, settling in Chelsea.

Mortimer was educated at John L. Young's Adelaide Educational Institution, attended classes at Adelaide's School of Design, exhibited drawings with the South Australian Society of Arts, and did some excellent work as a photo-colourist, but his formal art training began at the School of Art in London in 1878, after his family had moved back to England in 1875. Edward Poynter was a fellow student at the school. Menpes first exhibited at the Royal Academy in 1880, and, over the following 20 years, 35 of his paintings and etchings were shown at the Academy. His father, late in life, also developed a passion for painting and did some excellent work.

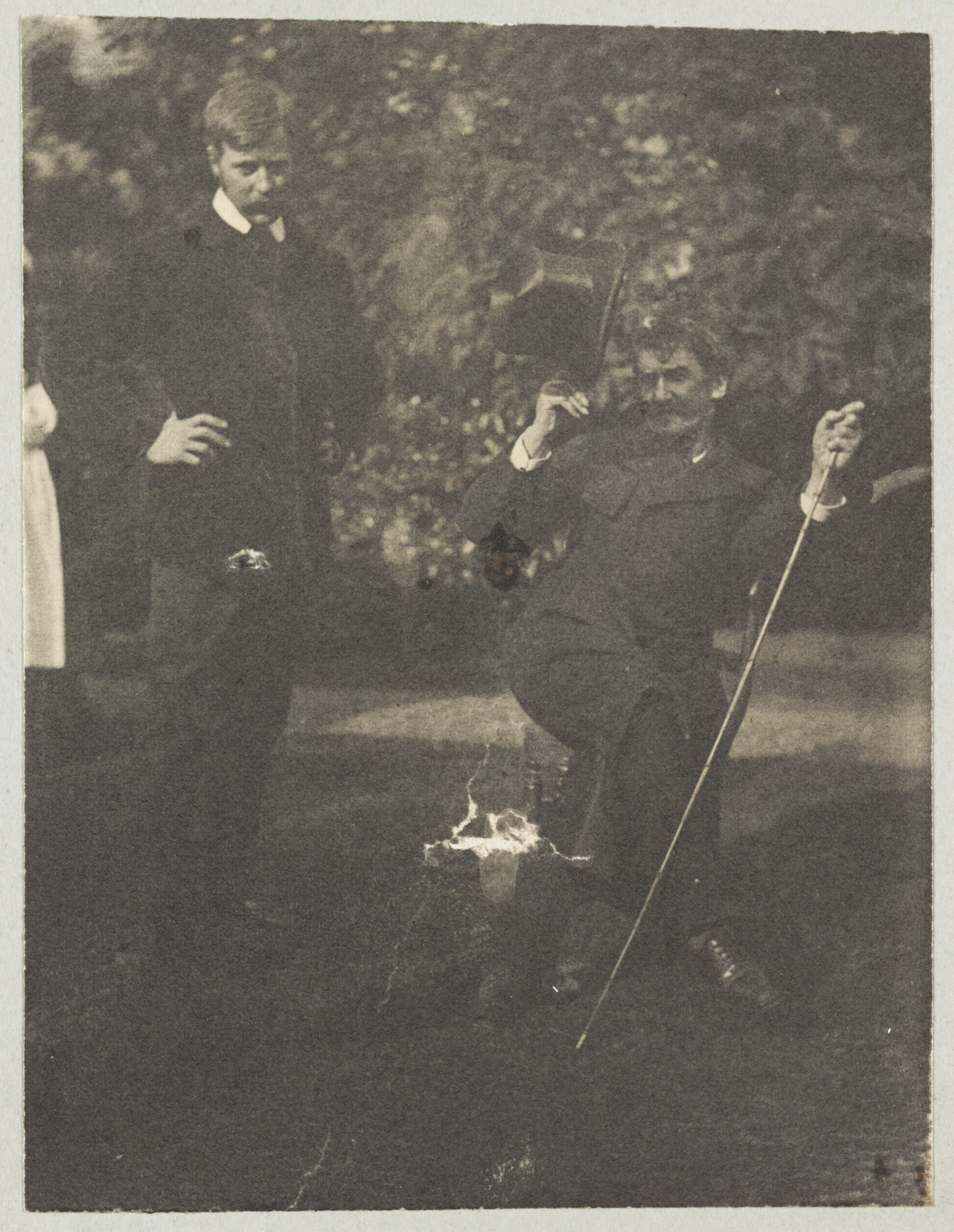
Menpes (standing) with Whistler, 1885

Menpes set off on a sketching tour of Brittany in 1880, during which he met James McNeill Whistler. He became Whistler's pupil, and at one stage shared a flat with him at Cheyne Walk on the Chelsea Embankment in London. He was taught etching by Whistler, whose influence, together with that of Japanese design, is evident in his later work. Menpes became a major figure in the etching revival, producing more than seven hundred different etchings and drypoints, which he usually printed himself. As early as 1880, a selection of ten of his drypoint portraits, donated to the British Museum by Charles A. Howell, brought him critical acclaim.

In 1886 he agreed to stand as the godfather to his friend Oscar Wilde's son Vyvyan, after John Ruskin had declined due to his age.

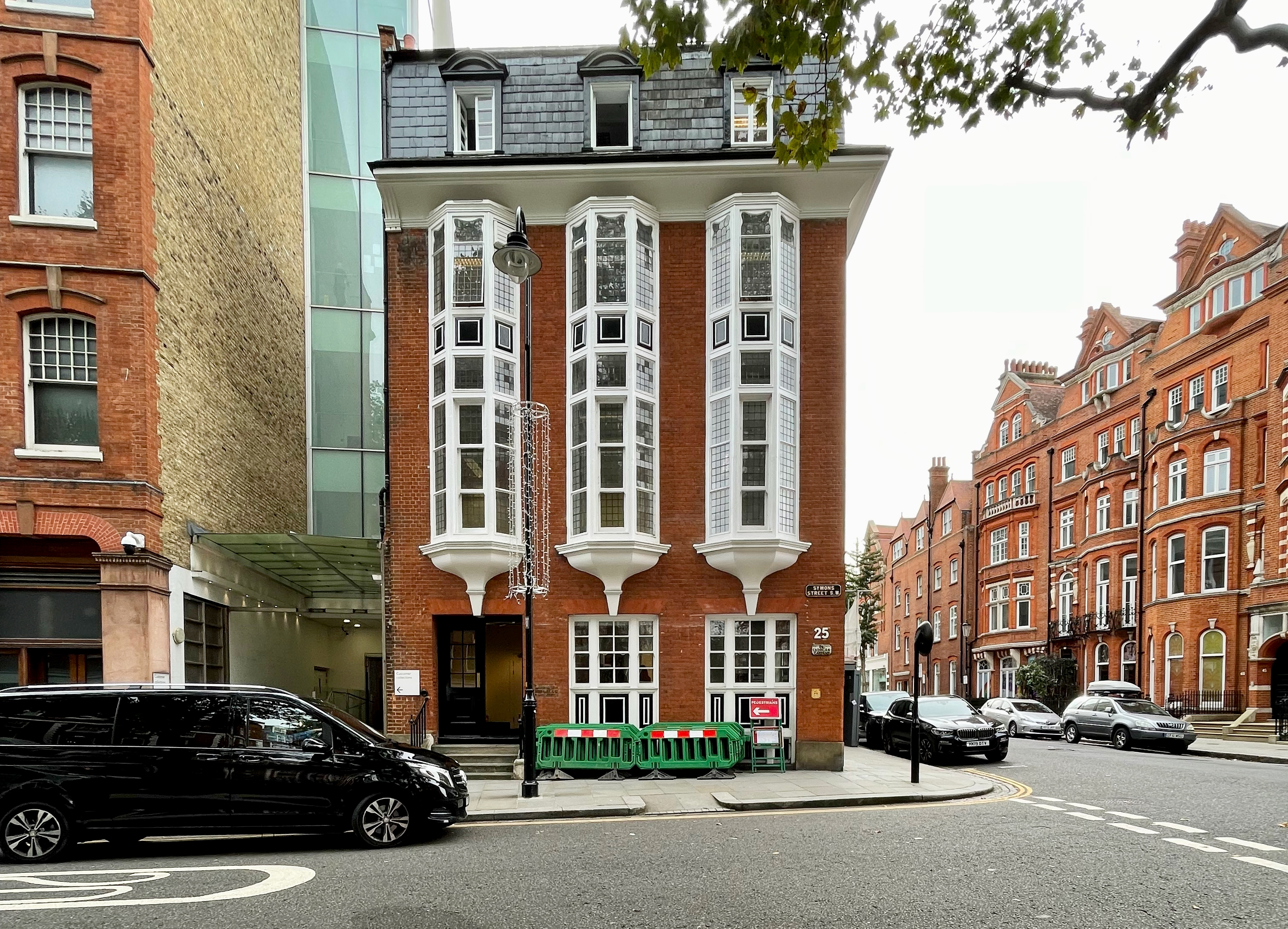
25 Cadogan Gardens, designed for Menpes by A. H. Mackmurdo and built in 1899. It was famous for its Japanese-style interiors.

A visit to Japan in 1887 led to his first one-man exhibition at Dowdeswell's Gallery in London. Menpes moved into a property at 25 Cadogan Gardens, Sloane Square, designed for him by A. H. Mackmurdo in 1888 and decorated it in the Japanese style. Whistler and Menpes quarrelled in 1888 over the interior design of the house, which Whistler felt was a brazen copying of his own ideas. The house was sold in 1900, and Menpes moved to Kent.

In 1900, after the outbreak of the Boer War, Menpes was sent to South Africa as a war artist for the weekly illustrated magazine Black and White. After the end of the war in 1902 he travelled widely, visiting Burma, Egypt, France, India, Italy, Japan, Kashmir, Mexico, Morocco, and Spain. Many of his illustrations were published in travel books by A & C Black. His book on the Delhi Durbar was an illustrated record of the commemoration in Delhi of the coronation of King Edward VII.

For the last 30 years of his life, Menpes retired to Iris Court, Pangbourne from where he managed his Purley-on-Thames business, "Menpes Fruit Farms". He built forty large greenhouses in which to grow carnations and eight cottages to accommodate the farm workers. He died in Pangbourne in 1938.

Menpes became a member of the Royal Society of Painter-Etchers and Engravers (RE) in 1881, Royal Society of British Artists (RBA) in 1885, Royal Institute of Painters in Water Colours (RI) in 1897 and Royal Institute of Oil Painters (ROI) in 1899.

An exhibition of his work, The World of Mortimer Menpes: Painter, Etcher, Raconteur opened at the Art Gallery of South Australia on 14 June 2014.

== Family ==
Menpes, his parents and three of his siblings left for England in February 1875, never to return to Australia. However five of Menpes's sisters remained in South Australia. Four daughters married in Adelaide: Mary Ann (1839–1929), born aboard the Moffatt and married John Foach Hillier in 1865; Fanny married Robert Uphill in 1865; and Matilda (born 1850) in 1873 married the Rev. J(ohn) Hall Angas, a Presbyterian minister of Port Adelaide, later in Victoria. His fifth daughter Jessie (born 1853) married Robert Whitbread, of Blinman, in 1876. James Henry (born 1844), Emma (born 1857) and Louisa (born 1859) left with Mortimer and their parents for England in 1875.

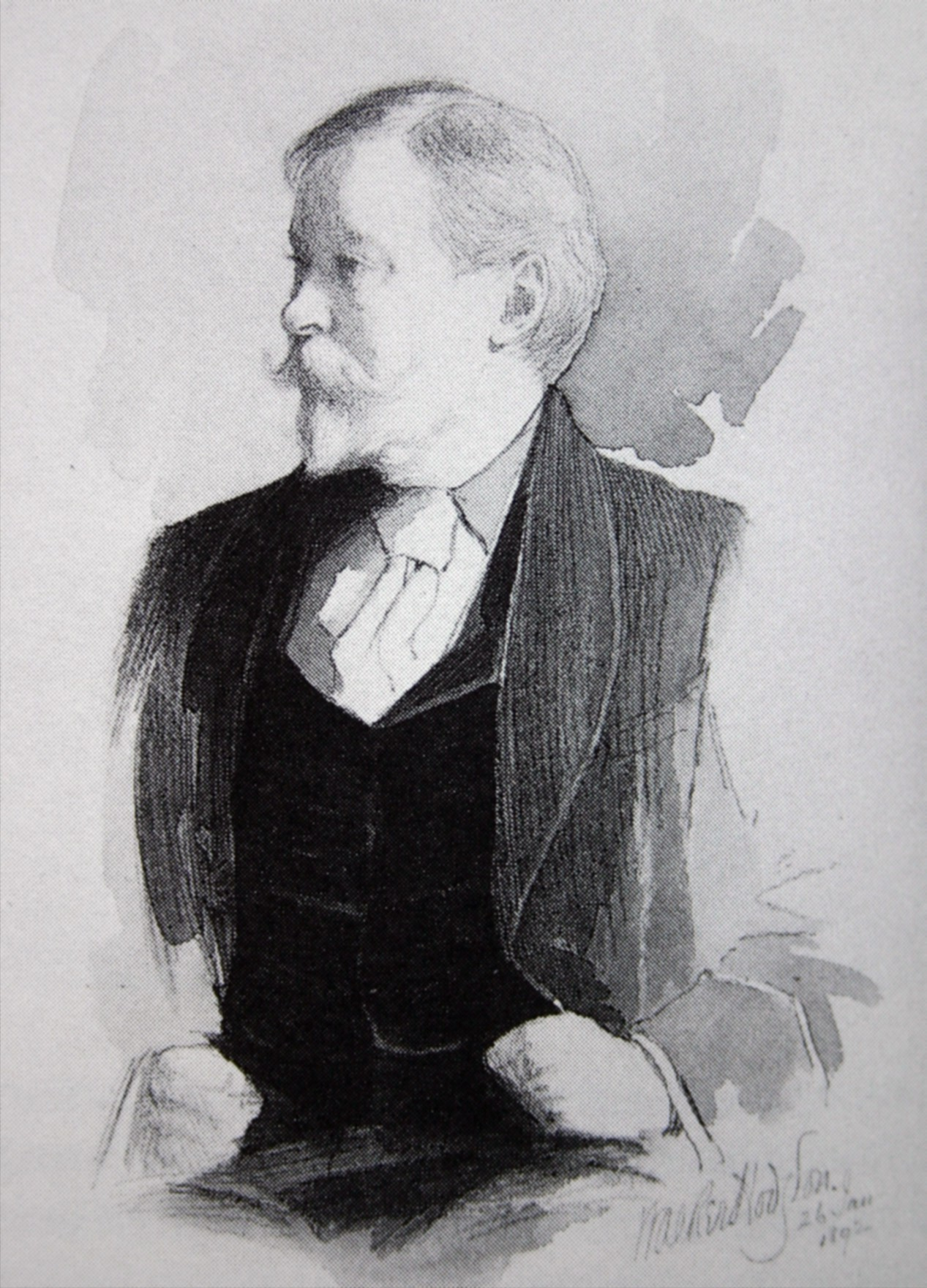
Portrait of Menpes by William Walker Hodgson, 1892

On 26 April 1875 at All Soul's Church, Langham Place, London, Menpes married fellow Australian Rosa Mary Grosse (1857 – 23 August 1936). Miss Grosse was a fellow-passenger on the RMSS Nubia that took the Menpes family to London in 1875. She was an orphan: her mother Rosetta Matilda Grosse died in 1866 and her father James Grosse, a fellow member with James Menpes of the Port Adelaide Corporation and whose Will was executed by Menpes, in 1874. They had a son, Mortimer James (b. 1879) and two daughters, Rose Maud Goodwin and Dorothy Whistler.

Menpes's cousin Thomas Smith was a leading Australian rules footballer of the 1870s, winning three Port Adelaide Football Club Best and Fairest awards in succession.

== Work ==
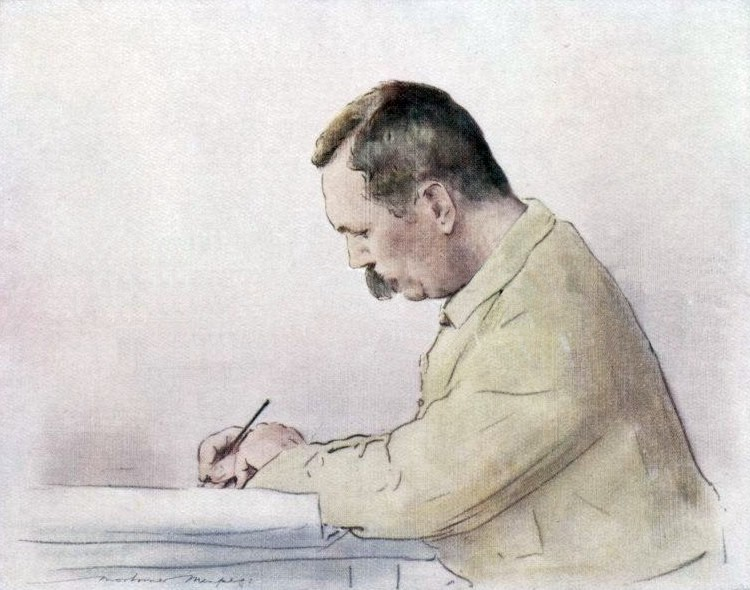
Arthur Conan Doyle by Mortimer Menpes

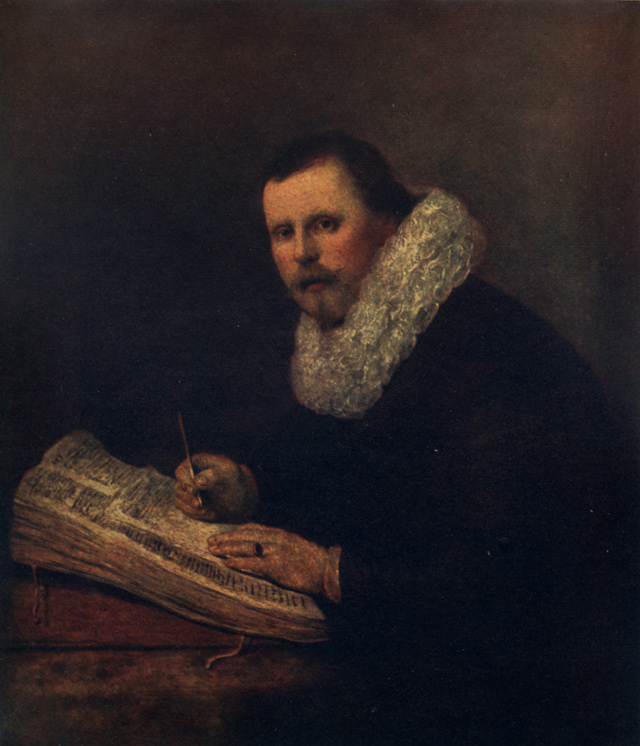
Menpes's Portrait of Savant after Rembrandt's Portrait of a Scholar

Menpes painted in oil and watercolour as well as being a prolific printmaker, producing over 700 etchings and drypoints during his career to great acclaim. A definitive catalog raisonne of his printed works was published in 2012 which also included an extensive biography and his exhibition history.

He developed a special form of colour etching and exhibited coloured etchings at Dowdeswell's Gallery in London in late 1911/early 1912. He was also a pioneer, with Carl Hentschel (1864–1926), in the development of techniques to reproduce coloured art works in book form. His book, 'War Impressions', published in April 1901 by A. & C. Black, was the first book to faithfully reproduce art works in color, based on watercolors done by Menpes in South Africa, and therefore was the forerunner of all illustrated art books. Menpes also founded the Menpes Press of London and Watford to produce colored illustrated books using the Hentschel Colourtype Process, which was a photographic process that involved taking three photographs of an art work using three different color filters (red, blue and yellow) and then combining them in the printing process. Menpes was a great traveler and undertook artistic journeys to Japan, China, Burma, Kashmir, Mexico, India, Turkey, Palestine and Egypt as well as within Europe to Brittany, Spain, Italy, Switzerland and other places, often returning from such travels to mount exhibitions of his works. At the beginning of the twentieth century, Menpes also produced the "Menpes Series of Great Masters", which were copies by him of works by Old Masters such as Rembrandt, Van Dyck and others which were reproduced in printed form for sale. In 1911, Menpes donated 38 of his copies in oil to the Australian Government; these works have subsequently become part of the Pictures Collection at the National Library of Australia.

Some pencil sketches by Menpes were published in the Adelaide Observer in 1903. They are portraits of Sir Charles Todd, Sir James Fergusson and the Rev. Canon Green; Dean Marryat, Sir Anthony Musgrave and Dr. Schomburgk; Charles Mann, Sir Arthur Blyth and William Townsend Sir William Milne, Thomas Playford and George Stevenson, Jun.

== Bibliography ==
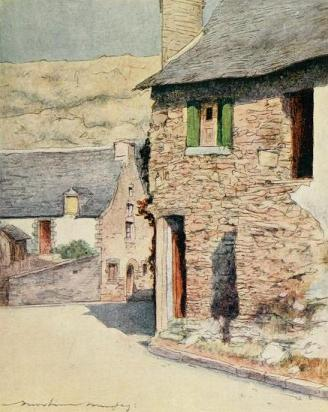
At Rochefort-en-Terre (from "Brittany")

Illustrated by Menpes

- Menpes, Dorothy. Japan: a record in colour (A & C Black, 1901).
- Menpes, Dorothy. The Durbar (London: A & C Black, 1903)
- Menpes, Dorothy. World's Children (London: A & C Black, 1903).
- Menpes, Dorothy. Venice (A & C Black, 1904).
- Loti, Pierre. Madame Prune (A & C Black, 1905).
- Menpes, Dorothy. Brittany (A & C Black, 1905).
- Steel, Flora Annie. India (A & C Black, 1905).
- Mitton, G. E. The Thames (A & C Black, 1906).
- Blake, Sir H. A. China (A & C Black, 1909)
- Menpes, Dorothy. Paris (A & C Black, 1909).
- Finnemore, John. India (A & C Black, 1910).
- Mitton, G. E. The people of India (A & C Black, 1910).
- Blathwayt, R. Through life and round the world, being the story of my life (E.P. Dutton, 1917).
- Finnemore, John. Home life in India (A & C Black, 1917)
- Home, Gordon. France (A & C Black, 1918).

Written and illustrated by Menpes

- War impressions, being a record in colour; (A & C Black, 1901).
- Whistler as I knew him (A & C Black, 1904)
- Rembrandt (A & C Black, 1905)
- Henry Irving (A & C Black, 1906).
- Gainsborough (A & C Black, 1909).
- Lord Kitchener (A & C Black, 1915).
- Lord Roberts (A & C Black, 1915).
