= Arthur Diósy =

British writer and Japanophile (1856–1923)

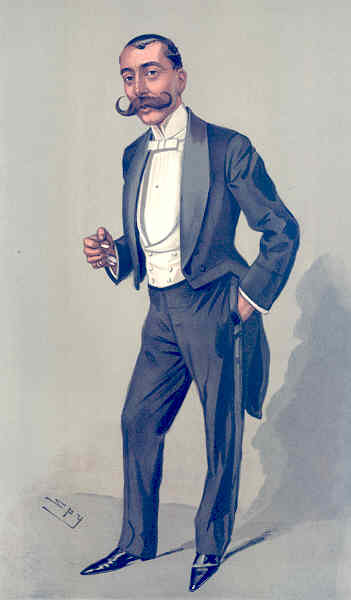
- A caricature of Arthur Diósy, by Spy.
- Born: June 6, 1856; London, United Kingdom
- Died: January 2, 1923 (aged 66); Nice, France
- Known for: Founding the Japan Society of London
- Spouse: Florence Hill
- Father: Márton Diósy

Arthur Diósy (June 6, 1856 – January 2, 1923) was a British writer, lecturer, polyglot, and Japanophile. He is known for having established the Japan Society of London (otherwise known simply as the Japan Society, in the United Kingdom). He was fluent in English and Japanese, and published several writings and editorial contributions (in English), with his most famous and influential publication being the book The New Far East.

== Early life ==
Diósy was born in 1923 in Paddington, London, to a Hungarian father and French mother. His father, Márton Diósy, was a Hungarian patriot and secretary to statesman Lajos Kossuth, and had fled the country when the Hungarian Revolution of 1848 failed. As he was physically weak as a child, he was educated at home by his father. He was exposed to a variety of foreign languages at a young age, and reportedly taught himself several languages, including Portuguese, Dutch, and Japanese.

In 1868, he enrolled in the then-newly established London International College, and remained there until 1871, when he left to continue his schooling in Germany, attending schools in Lippstadt and Düsseldorf. Upon his return to the United Kingdom, he volunteered for the Naval Artillery Corps and underwent training from 1875 to 1882. In 1879, while in Málaga, he met Florence Hill, and proposed to her in Italy in 1881. They were married in 1882, on his twenty-sixth birthday.

== Career ==
In September 1891, at a meeting of the Japanese Section of the International Congress of Orientalists held in London, Diósy proposed the establishment of a society for the promotion of Japanese studies. The proposal was adopted unanimously. The first meeting of the council was in December of that year, and Diósy was joined by other individuals with ties to Japan, such as Daigoro Goh, the Chancellor at the Japanese Consulate-General in London. Professor William Anderson took the position of chair. In 1892, Emperor Meiji gifted 100 guineas to the society, hoping for its "continued prosperity". In 1894, Diósy was awarded the Order of the Rising Sun, Third Class, upon the recommendation of Ambassador to the United Kingdom Aoki Shūzō.

Public interest in Japan, in the United Kingdom, grew after the First Sino-Japanese War. During the period of and after the war, Diósy, who possessed extensive knowledge about the country, delivered a series of lectures across the United Kingdom, all of which were said to have been well received. He then wrote The New Far East, which was published in 1898 and sold well; by 1915, the book had reached its eighth edition.

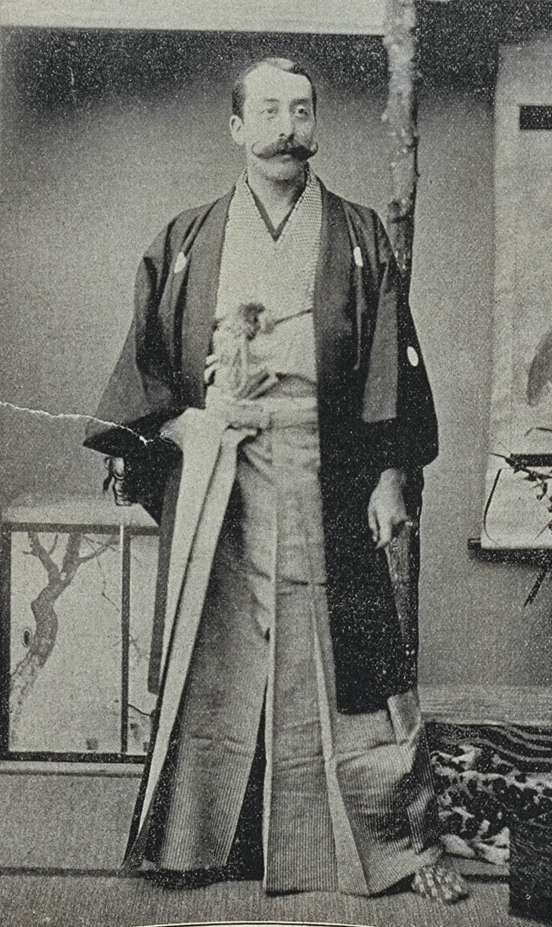
Diósy, pictured in 1899.

In February 1899, Diósy, along with his wife, departed from London to visit Japan for the first time, travelling via America and arriving at Yokohama in April. He was received by Daigoro Goh and other associates, and travelled to Tokyo through train. He and his wife were invited to a litany of events, including a luncheon whose attendees included ministers of the Imperial Household. They then travelled through various other cities, including Nagoya, Kyoto, Osaka, and Kobe. They returned to Tokyo in May, where he delivered several lectures on the politics and economy of Japan until mid-June. In July, a telegram bearing news of the death of Florence's mother prompted the couple of begin preparations for their return home. On the eve of his departure, Diósy had visited the Yoshiwara red-light district with a friend to study it, and this was mistakenly reported as a scandal of soliciting services by a newspaper. Further evidence showed that Diósy had not solicited the services of any woman, nor had he spent the night; a rebuttal was then published, and the truthful account was maintained in his wife's diary. Diósy departed from Japan in August, after four months of being there.

== Later years and death ==
In 1902, the Anglo-Japanese Alliance was signed in London between the United Kingdom and the Empire of Japan. Diósy, who had supported the proposal alongside journalists and figures such as Edwin Arnold and Francis Brinkley, welcomed its signing.

In 1904, when Diósy was chairman of the Japan Society, he faced growing criticism for his flamboyant self-promotion and for claiming sole credit for the establishment of the society. The situation escalated to a point where, after his resignation as chairman, he expressed his intent to withdraw from the society altogether. However, the situation was amicably resolved, and he continued to serve as vice-president after stepping down as chairman.

At the outbreak of the First World War, Diósy delivered numerous lectures to encourage military recruitment, and travelled across Europe to various combat zones to give talks to members of Allied forces.

Diósy died in 1923, in Nice, where he was staying at the time. It was said that he was generally in good spirits and had even engaged in some dancing the previous night. He was aged 66 at the time of his death.

== See also ==
- Japan Society of London
- Anglo-Japanese Alliance
- Japan–United Kingdom relations
- Order of the Rising Sun
