= Philip Bourke Marston =

English poet

Philip Bourke Marston (13 August 1850 – 13 February 1887) was an English poet.

== Life ==
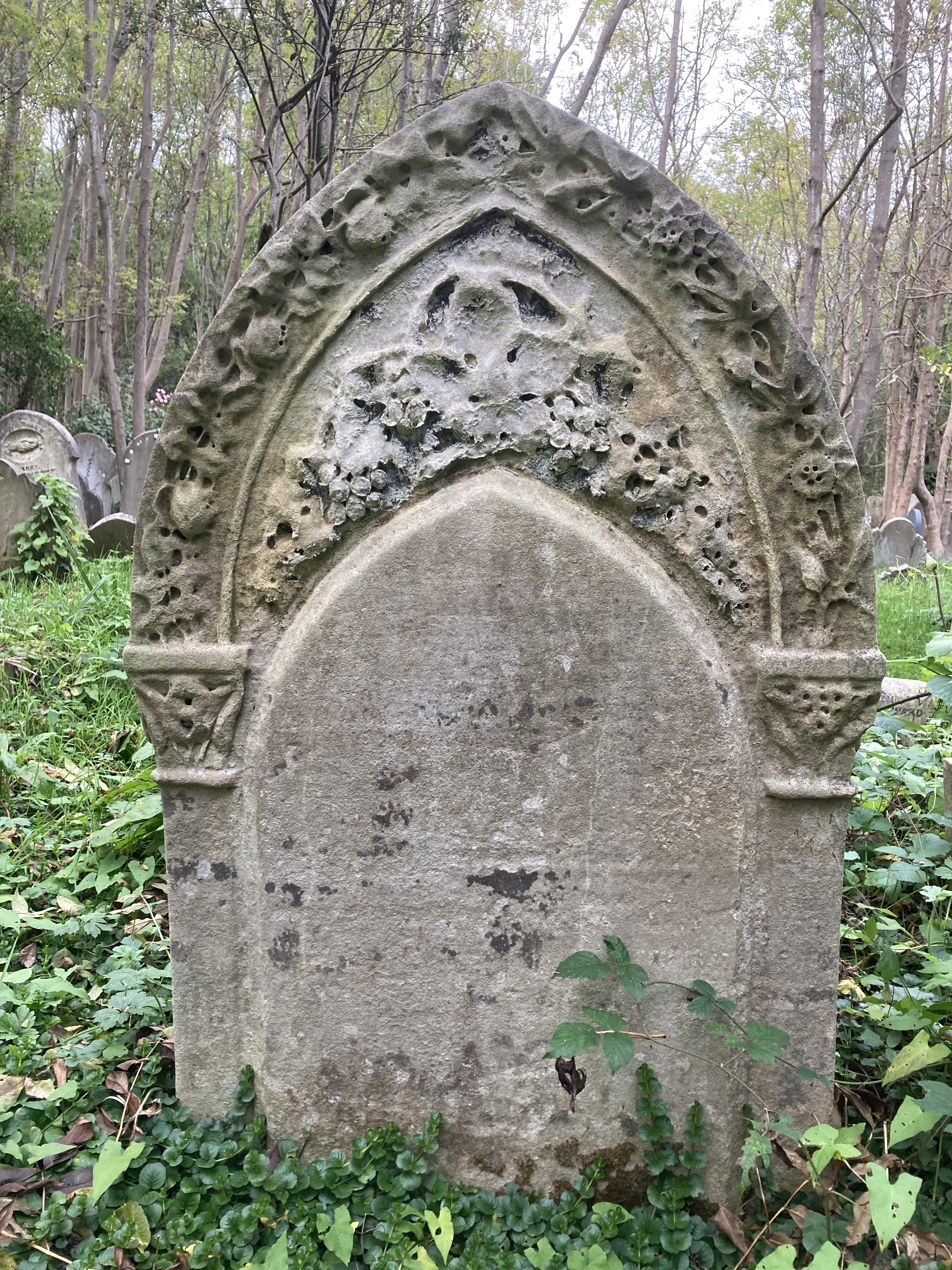
Grave of Philip Bourke Marston in Highgate Cemetery

He was born in London 13 August 1850, the son of John Westland Marston. Philip James Bailey and Dinah Maria Mulock were his sponsors, and the most popular of the latter's short poems, "Philip, my King," is addressed to him. At age three, Marston partially lost his vision due to the injudicious administration of belladonna (as a prophylactic against scarlet fever), potentially aggravated by an accidental blow. For many years he maintained enough vision to see, in his own words, "the tree-boughs waving in the wind, the pageant of sunset in the west, and the glimmer of a fire upon the hearth;" and this dim, imperfect perception may have been more stimulating to his imagination than either perfect sight or total blindness.

He indulged, like Hartley Coleridge, in a consecutive series of imaginary adventures and in the reveries called up by music.

His skills in verbal expression and melody were soon manifested in poems of remarkable merit for his years, and displaying a power of delineating the aspects of nature which, his affliction considered, seemed almost incomprehensible. These efforts met full recognition from the brilliant literary circle then gathered around his father. Marston was intensely happy for a time in the affection of Mary Nesbit. The death of his betrothed from rapid consumption, in November 1871, devastated him, and was the precursor of a series of calamities which may have produced the morbid element in his views of life and nature.

In 1874, a friend, Oliver Madox Brown, died suddenly. In 1878 Marston lost with equal suddenness his beloved sister Cicely, to whom one of his most beautiful poems is addressed. His surviving sister, Eleanor, died early in the following year; her husband, Arthur O'Shaughnessy, followed shortly. In 1882, the death of Marston's chief poetic ally and inspirer, Dante Gabriel Rossetti, was followed closely by that of another kindred spirit, James Thomson, who was carried dying from his blind friend's rooms, where he had sought refuge from his latest miseries early in June of the same year.

Marston's poetry became sorrowful and melancholy. The idylls of flower-life, such as the early The Rose and the Wind, were succeeded by dreams of sleep and the repose of death. These qualities and gradations of feeling are traceable through his three published collections, Songtide (1871), All in All (1873) and Wind Voices (1883). Marston's poetry was collected in 1892 by Louise Chandler Moulton, a loyal friend, and herself a poet.

In his later years Marston wrote short stories for Home Chimes, as well as American magazines, through the agency of Mrs. Chandler Moulton. His popularity in America far exceeded that in his own country.

The three volumes of poetry published in his lifetime, Song-Tide and other Poems (1871), All in All (1875), and Wind Voices (1883), abound with beautiful thoughts expressed in beautiful language. His short stories were collected by Mr. Sharp under the title of For a Song's Sake and other Stories (1887, 8vo).

He died on 13 February 1887 and was buried on the eastern side of Highgate Cemetery. The inscription on the headstone above his grave (plot no.27388) has now entirely worn away.

== Literature ==
- Coulson Kernahan, in Sorrow and Song (Philadelphia, 1894)
- William Sharp, in Papers Critical and Reminiscent (New York, 1912)
