= Air warfare of World War II =

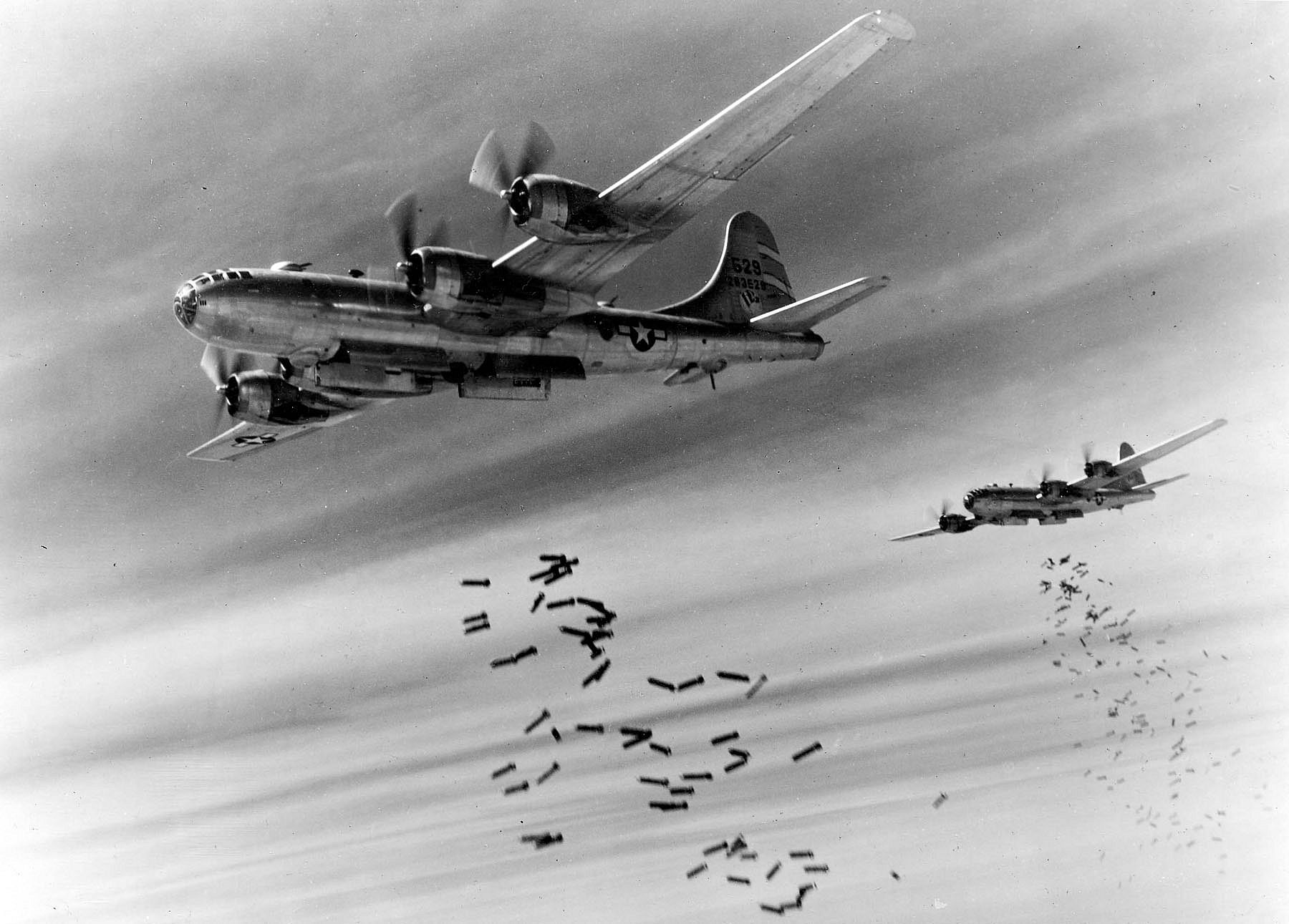
Boeing B-29 Superfortress long-range strategic bombers releasing their payloads during the Burma campaign in 1945. The B-29 was the largest aircraft to have a significant operational role in World War II and remains the only aircraft in history to have ever used a nuclear weapon in combat.

Air warfare was a major component in all theaters of World War II and, together with anti-aircraft warfare, consumed a large fraction of the industrial output of the major powers. Germany and Japan depended on air forces that were closely integrated with land and naval forces; the Axis powers downplayed the advantage of fleets of strategic bombers and were late in appreciating the need to defend against Allied strategic bombing. By contrast, Britain and the United States took an approach that greatly emphasized strategic bombing and (to a lesser degree) tactical control of the battlefield by air as well as adequate air defenses. Both Britain and the U.S. built substantially larger strategic forces of large, long-range bombers. Simultaneously, they built tactical air forces that could win air superiority over the battlefields, thereby giving vital assistance to ground troops. The U.S. Navy and Royal Navy also built a powerful naval-air component based on aircraft carriers, as did the Imperial Japanese Navy; these played the central role in the war at sea.

== Pre-war planning ==
Before 1939, one side (Japan) operated under largely theoretical models of air warfare. Italian theorist Giulio Douhet in the 1920s summarised the faith that airmen during and after World War I developed in the efficacy of strategic bombing. Many said it alone could win wars, as "the bomber will always get through". The Americans were confident that the Boeing B-17 Flying Fortress bomber could reach targets, protected by its own weapons, and bomb, using the Norden bombsight, with "pickle barrel" accuracy. Japanese aviation pioneers felt that they had developed the finest naval aviators in the world.

== Air forces ==
=== Germany: Luftwaffe ===
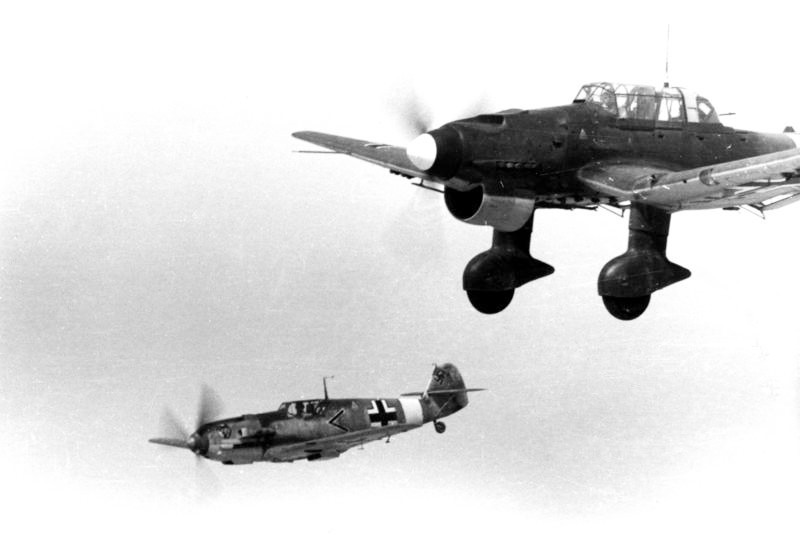
A Messerschmitt Bf 109 escorting a Junkers Ju 87 of the Luftwaffe in 1941

The Luftwaffe was the aerial warfare branch of the Wehrmacht. Under the leadership of Hermann Göring, it was able to learn and test new combat techniques in the Spanish Civil War. The war also led to greater emphasis on anti-air weapons and fighter aircraft due to their ability to defend against enemy bombers. Its advanced technology and rapid growth led to exaggerated fears in the 1930s that helped to persuade the British and French into appeasement. In the war the Luftwaffe performed well in 1939–41, as its Stuka dive bombers terrified enemy infantry units. But the Luftwaffe was poorly coordinated with overall German strategy, and never ramped up to the size and scope needed in a total war, partly due to a lack of military aircraft production infrastructure for both completed airframes and powerplants when compared to either the Soviet Union or the United States. The Luftwaffe was deficient in radar technology except for their usable UHF and later VHF band airborne intercept radar designs such as the Lichtenstein and Neptun radar systems for their night fighters. The Messerschmitt Me 262 jet fighter did not enter service until July 1944, and the lightweight Heinkel He 162 appeared only during the last months of the air war in Europe. The Luftwaffe could not deal with Britain's increasingly lethal defensive fighter screen after the Battle of Britain, or the faster P-51 Mustang escort fighters after 1943.

When the Luftwaffe's fuel supply ran dry in 1944 due to the oil campaign of World War II, it was reduced to anti-aircraft flak roles, and many of its men were sent to infantry units. By 1944 it operated 39,000 flak batteries staffed with a million people in uniform, both men and women.

The Luftwaffe lacked the bomber forces for strategic bombing, because it did not think such bombing was worthwhile, especially following the 3 June 1936, death of General Walther Wever, the prime proponent of a strategic bomber force for the Luftwaffe. They did attempt some strategic bombing in the east with the problematic Heinkel He 177A. Their one success was destroying an airbase at Poltava Air Base, Ukraine during the Allied Operation Frantic, which housed 43 new B-17 bombers and a million tons of aviation fuel.

Introduction of turbojet-powered combat aircraft, mostly with the Messerschmitt Me 262 twin-jet fighter, the Heinkel He 162 light jet fighter and the Arado Ar 234 reconnaissance-bomber was pioneered by the Luftwaffe, but the delayed period (1944–45) of their introduction – much of which was due to the lengthy development time for both the BMW 003 and Junkers Jumo 004 jet engine designs—as well as the failure to produce usable examples of their two long-developed higher-power aviation engines, the Junkers Jumo 222 multibank 24-cylinder piston engine of some 2,500 hp, and the advanced Heinkel HeS 011 turbojet of nearly 2,800 lb of thrust, each of which were meant to power many advanced German airframe design proposals in the last years of the war—meant that they were introduced "too little, too late", as so many other advanced German aircraft designs (and indeed, many other German military weapon systems) had been during the later war years.

Although Germany's allies, especially Italy and Finland, had air forces of their own, there was very little coordination with them. Not until very late in the war did Germany share its aircraft and alternative fuel blueprints and technology with its ally Japan, resulting in the Nakajima Kikka jet fighter and the Mitsubishi Shusui rocket fighter, respectively based on the Me 262A and Me 163B—both of which, similarly, came far too late for Japan to improve its defensive aircraft systems, or to make alternative fuels and lubricants.

=== Britain: Royal Air Force ===
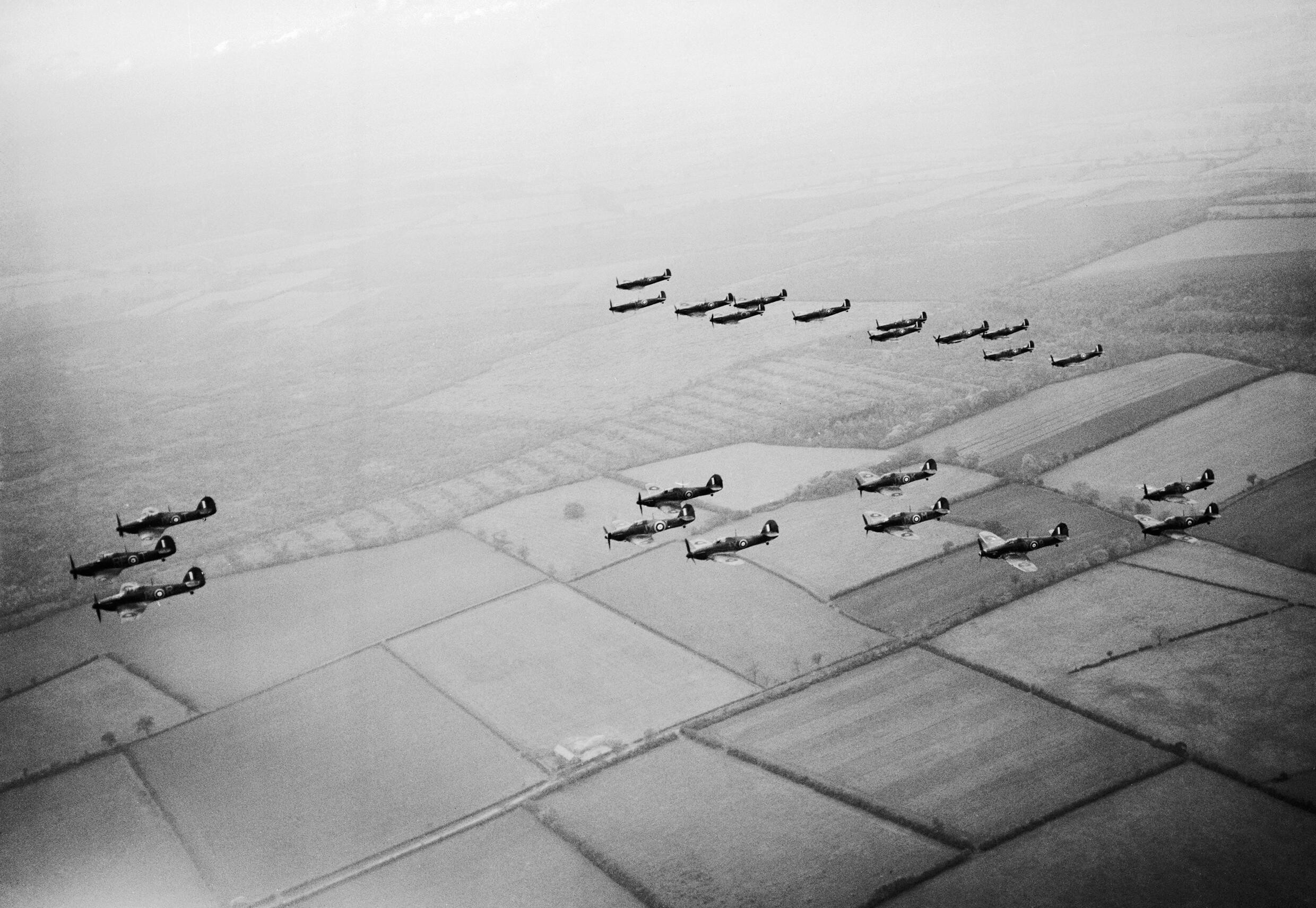
Hawker Hurricanes and Supermarine Spitfires of the RAF flying in formation in 1940

The British had their own very well-developed theory of strategic bombing, and built the long-range bombers to implement it.

Once it became clear that Germany was a threat, the RAF started on a large expansion, with many airfields being set up and the number of squadrons increased. From 42 squadrons with 800 aircraft in 1934, the RAF had reached 157 squadrons and 3,700 aircraft by 1939. They combined the newly developed radar with communications centres to direct their fighter defences. Their medium bombers were capable of reaching the German industrial centre of the Ruhr, and larger bombers were under development.

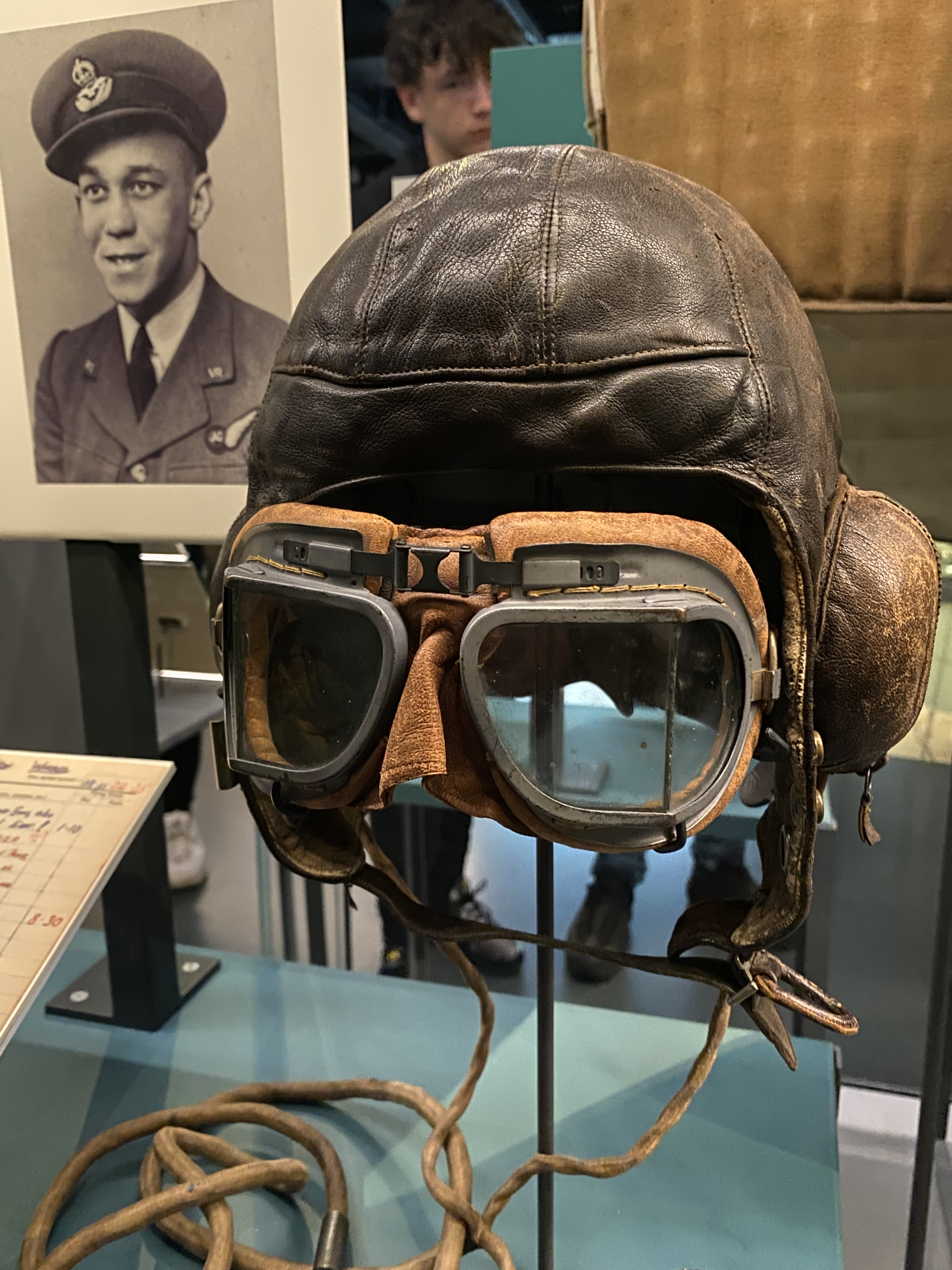
Aviation goggles and flying helmet used by famous RAF pilot Billy Strachan (1921-1998)

The RAF underwent rapid expansion following the outbreak of war against Germany in 1939. This included the training in other Commonwealth nations (particularly Canada) of half of British and Commonwealth aircrews, some 167,000 men in all. It was the second largest in Europe. The RAF also integrated Polish and other airmen who had escaped from Hitler's Europe. In Europe, the RAF was in operational control of Commonwealth aircrews and Commonwealth squadrons although these retained some degree of independence (such as the formation of No. 6 Group RCAF to put Canadian squadrons together in a nationally identifiable unit).

The RAF had three major combat commands based in the United Kingdom: RAF Fighter Command charged with defence of the UK, RAF Bomber Command (formed 1936) which operated the bombers that would be offensive against the enemy, and RAF Coastal Command which was to protect Allied shipping and attack enemy shipping. The Royal Navy's Fleet Air Arm operated land-based fighters in defence of naval establishments and carrier-based aircraft. Later in the war the RAF's fighter force was divided into two Air Defence of Great Britain (ADGB) for protecting the UK and the Second Tactical Air Force for ground offensive support in the North West Europe campaign.

Bomber Command participated in two areas of attack – the strategic bombing campaign against German war production, and the less well known mining of coastal waters off Germany (known as Gardening) to contain its naval operations and prevent the U-boats from freely operating against Allied shipping. In order to attack German industry by night the RAF developed navigational aids, tactics to overwhelm the German defences control system, tactics directly against German night-fighter forces, target marking techniques, many electronic aids in defence and attack, and supporting electronic warfare aircraft. The production of heavy aircraft competed with resources for the Army and the Navy, and it was a source of disagreement as to whether the effort could be more profitably expended elsewhere.

Increasingly heavy losses during the latter part of 1943 due to the reorganized Luftwaffe night fighter system (Wilde Sau tactics), and Sir Arthur Harris' costly attempts to destroy Berlin in the winter of 1943/44, led to serious doubts as to whether Bomber Command was being used to its fullest potential. In early 1944 the UK air arm was put under Eisenhower's direct control where it played a vital role in preparing the way for the Overlord Invasion.

=== Soviet Union: Soviet Air Force ===
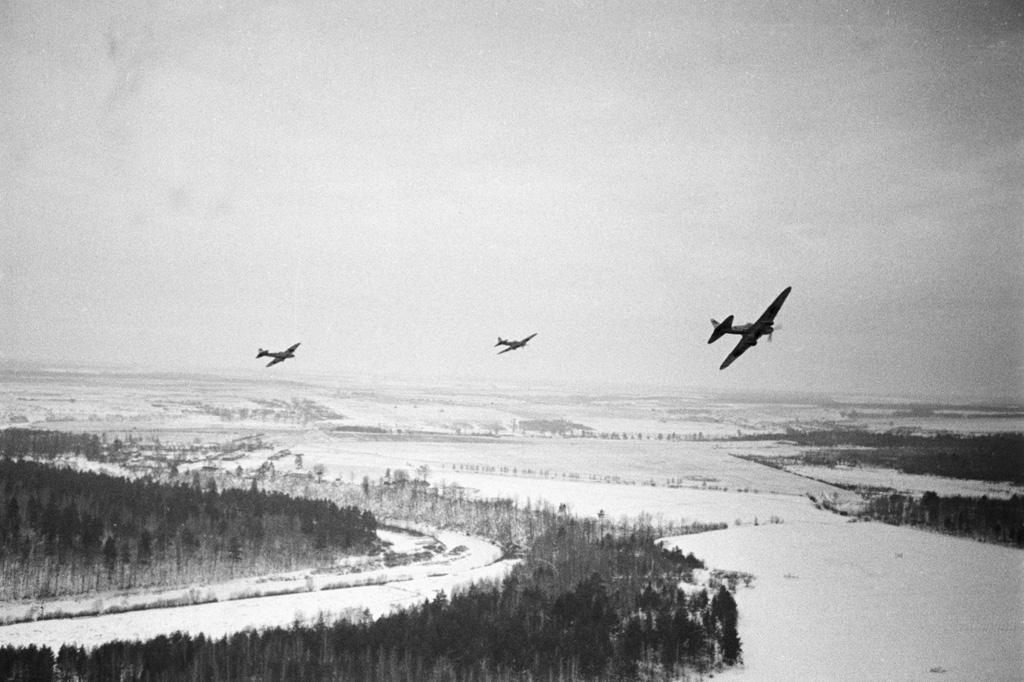
Ilyushin Il-2s of the Soviet Air Forces near Moscow in 1943

By the end of the war, Soviet annual aircraft production had risen sharply with annual Soviet production peaking at 40,000 aircraft in 1944. Some 157,000 aircraft were produced, of which 126,000 were combat types for the Voyenno-Vozdushnye Sily (Военно Воздушные Силы, lit. "Military Aerial Forces") or VVS, while the others were transports, trainers, and other auxiliary aircraft. The critical importance of the ground attack role in defending the Soviet Union from the Axis' Operation Barbarossa through to the final defeat of Nazi Germany with the Battle of Berlin resulted in the Soviet military aviation industry creating more examples of the Ilyushin Il-2 Shturmovik during the war than any other military aircraft design in aviation history, with just over 36,000 examples produced.

During the war the Soviets employed 7500 bombers to drop 30 million bombs on German targets, with a density that sometimes reached 100–150 tons/ sq kilometer.

=== United States: Army Air Forces ===
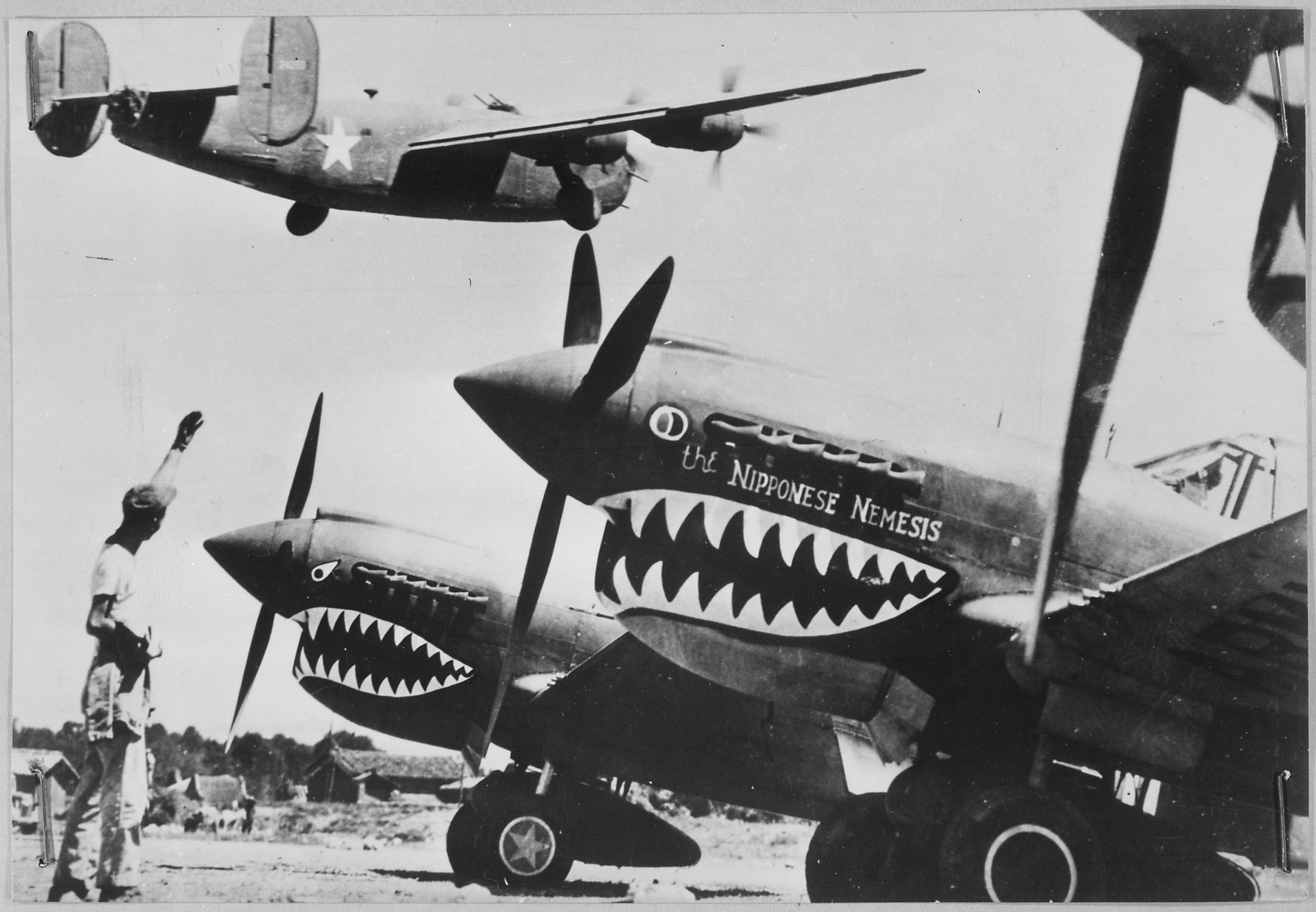
A Consolidated Liberator I flying over Curtiss P-40 Warhawks of the U.S. Army Air Forces in 1943

Before the attack on Pearl Harbor and during the period within which the predecessor U.S. Army Air Corps became the Army Air Forces in late June 1941, President Franklin D. Roosevelt gave command of the Navy to an aviator, Admiral Ernest King, with a mandate for an aviation-oriented war in the Pacific. FDR allowed King to build up land-based naval and Marine aviation, and seize control of the long-range bombers used in antisubmarine patrols in the Atlantic. Roosevelt basically agreed with Robert A. Lovett, the civilian Assistant Secretary of War for Air, who argued, "While I don't go so far as to claim that air power alone will win the war, I do claim the war will not be won without it."

Army Chief of Staff George C. Marshall rejected calls for complete independence for the Air Corps, because the land forces generals and the Navy were vehemently opposed. In the compromise that was reached it was understood that after the war, the aviators would get their independence. Meanwhile, the Air Corps became the Army Air Forces (AAF) in June 1941, combining all their personnel and units under a single commanding general, an airman. In 1942 the Army reorganized into three equal components, one of which was the AAF, which then had almost complete freedom in terms of internal administration. Thus the AAF set up its own medical service independent of the Surgeon General, its own WAC units, and its own logistics system. It had full control over the design and procurement of airplanes and related electronic gear and ordnance. Its purchasing agents controlled 15% of the nation's Gross National Product. Together with naval aviation, it recruited the best young men in the nation. General Henry H. Arnold headed the AAF. One of the first military men to fly, and the youngest colonel in World War I, he selected for the most important combat commands men who were ten years younger than their Army counterparts, including Ira Eaker (b. 1896), Jimmy Doolittle (b. 1896), Hoyt Vandenberg (b. 1899), Elwood "Pete" Queseda (b. 1904), and, youngest of them all, Curtis LeMay (b. 1906). Although a West Pointer himself, Arnold did not automatically turn to Academy men for top positions. Since he operated independent of theatre commanders, Arnold could and did move his generals around, and speedily removed underachievers.

Aware of the need for engineering expertise, Arnold went outside the military and formed close liaisons with top engineers like rocket specialist Theodore von Karmen at Caltech. Arnold was given seats on the US Joint Chiefs of Staff and the US-British Combined Chiefs of Staff. Arnold, however, was officially Deputy Chief of [Army] Staff, so on committees he deferred to his boss, General Marshall. Thus Marshall made all the basic strategic decisions, which were worked out by his "War Plans Division" (WPD, later renamed the Operations Division). WPD's section leaders were infantrymen or engineers, with a handful of aviators in token positions.

The AAF had a newly created planning division, whose advice was largely ignored by WPD. Airmen were also underrepresented in the planning divisions of the Joint Chiefs of Staff and of the Combined Chiefs. Aviators were largely shut out of the decision-making and planning process because they lacked seniority in a highly rank-conscious system. The freeze intensified demands for independence, and fueled a spirit of "proving" the superiority of air power doctrine. Because of the young, pragmatic leadership at the top, and the universal glamor accorded aviators, morale in the AAF was strikingly higher than anywhere else (except perhaps Navy aviation).

The AAF provided extensive technical training, promoted officers and enlisted faster, provided comfortable barracks and good food, and was safe, with an American government-sponsored pilot training program in place as far back as 1938, that did work in concert when necessary with the British Commonwealth's similar program within North America. The only dangerous jobs were voluntary ones as crew of fighters and bombers—or involuntary ones at jungle bases in the Southwest Pacific. Marshall, an infantryman uninterested in aviation before 1939, became a partial convert to air power and allowed the aviators more autonomy. He authorized vast spending on planes, and insisted that American forces had to have air supremacy before taking the offensive. However, he repeatedly overruled Arnold by agreeing with Roosevelt's requests in 1941–42 to send half of the new light bombers and fighters to the British and Soviets, thereby delaying the buildup of American air power.

The Army's major theatre commands were given to infantrymen Douglas MacArthur and Dwight D. Eisenhower. Neither had paid much attention to aviation before the war. However the air power advocate Jimmy Doolittle succeeded Eaker as 8th Air Force commander at the start of 1944. Doolittle instituted a critical change in strategic fighter tactics, and the 8th Air Force bomber raids faced less and less Luftwaffe defensive fighter opposition for the rest of the war.

Offensive counter-air, to clear the way for strategic bombers and an eventually decisive cross-channel invasion, was a strategic mission led by escort fighters partnered with heavy bombers. The tactical mission, however, was the province of fighter-bombers, assisted by light and medium bombers.

American theatre commanders became air power enthusiasts and built their strategies around the need for tactical air supremacy. MacArthur had been badly defeated in the Philippines in 1941–42 primarily because the Japanese controlled the sky. His planes were outnumbered and outclassed, his airfields shot up, his radar destroyed, and his supply lines cut. His infantry never had a chance. MacArthur vowed never again. His island-hopping campaign was based on the strategy of isolating Japanese strongholds while leaping past them. Each leap was determined by the range of his 5th Air Force, and the first task on securing an objective was to build an airfield to prepare for the next leap. Eisenhower's deputy at SHAEF was Air Chief Marshal Arthur Tedder, who had been commander of the Allied Mediterranean Air Command when Eisenhower was in charge of Allied operations in the Mediterranean.

== Doctrine and technology ==
The Allies won battlefield air supremacy in the Pacific in 1943, and in Europe in 1944. That meant that Allied supplies and reinforcements would get through to the battlefront, but not the enemy's. It meant the Allies could concentrate their strike forces wherever they pleased, and overwhelm the enemy with a preponderance of firepower. There was a specific campaign, within the overall strategic offensive, for suppression of enemy air defences, or, specifically, Luftwaffe fighters.

=== Aircrew training ===
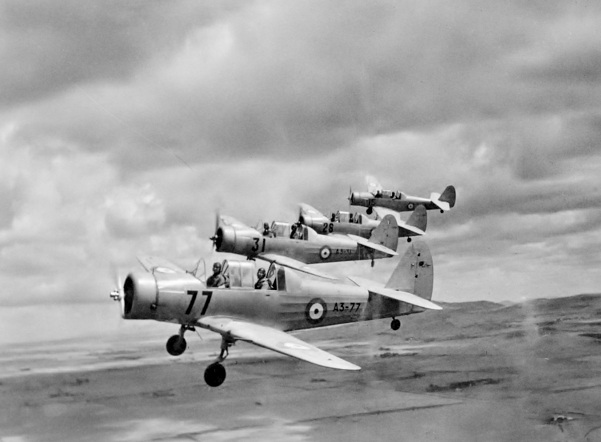
CAC Wackett trainers of the Royal Australian Air Force in 1942

While the Japanese began the war with a superb set of naval aviators, trained at the Misty Lagoon experimental air station, their practice, perhaps from the warrior tradition, was to keep the pilots in action until they died. The U.S. position, at least for naval aviation, was a strict rotation between sea deployments and shore duty, the latter including training replacements, personal training, and participating in doctrinal development. The U.S. strategic bombing campaign against Europe did this in principle, but relatively few crews survived the 25 missions of a rotation. On 27 December 1938, the United States had initiated the Civilian Pilot Training Program to vastly increase the number of ostensibly "civilian" American pilots, but this program also had the eventual effect of providing a large flight-ready force of trained pilots for future military action if the need arose.

Other countries had other variants. In some countries, it seemed to be a matter of personal choice if one stayed in combat or helped build the next generation. Even where there was a policy of using skills outside combat, some individuals, e.g. Guy Gibson VC insisted on returning to combat after a year. Both Gibson's successors at 617 Squadron were ordered off "ops" permanently – Leonard Cheshire VC after 102 operations, "Willie" Tait (DSO & 3 Bars) after 101 – reflecting the strain of prolonged operations.

The British Commonwealth Air Training Plan (and related schemes) as well as training British crew in North America, away from the war, contributed large numbers of aircrew from outside the UK to the forces under RAF operational control. The resulting "Article XV squadrons" nominally part of individual Commonwealth air forces were filled from a pool of mixed nationalities. While RAF Bomber Command let individuals form teams naturally and bomber aircrew were generally heterogeneous in origins, the Canadian government pushed for its bomber aircrew to be organised in one Group for greater recognition – No. 6 Group RCAF.

=== Logistics ===
==== Airfield construction ====
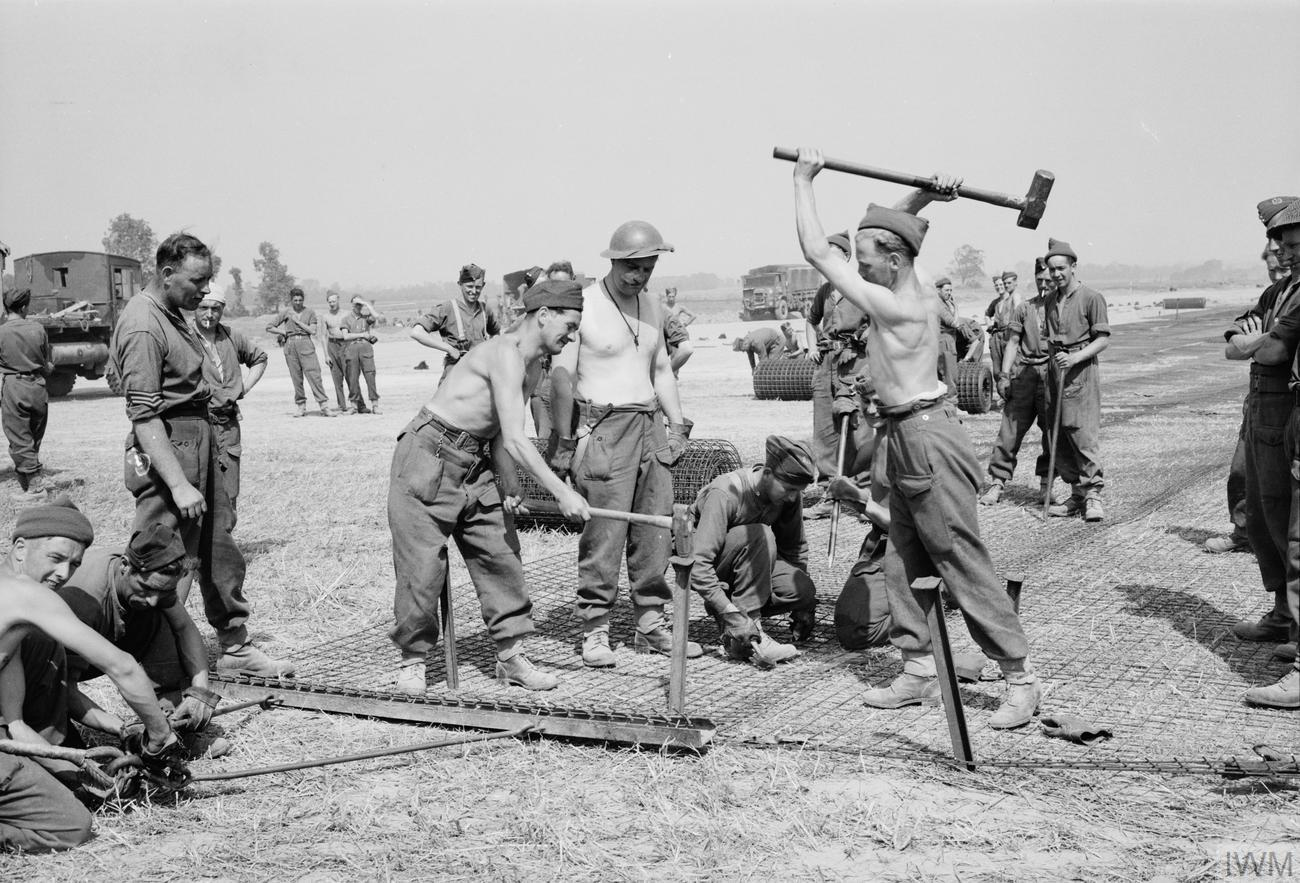
RAF construction workers finishing the construction of an airfield near Lingèvres in 1944

Arnold correctly anticipated that the U.S. would have to build forward airfields in inhospitable places. Working closely with the Army Corps of Engineers, he created Aviation Engineer Battalions that by 1945 included 118,000 men. Runways, hangars, radar stations, power generators, barracks, gasoline storage tanks, and ordnance dumps had to be built hurriedly on tiny coral islands, mud flats, featureless deserts, dense jungles, or exposed locations still under enemy artillery fire. The heavy construction gear had to be imported, along with the engineers, blueprints, steel-mesh landing mats, prefabricated hangars, aviation fuel, bombs and ammunition, and all necessary supplies. As soon as one project was finished the battalion would load up its gear and move forward to the next challenge, while headquarters inked in a new airfield on the maps.

The engineers opened an entirely new airfield in North Africa every other day for seven straight months. Once when heavy rains along the coast reduced the capacity of old airfields, two companies of Airborne Engineers loaded miniaturized gear into 56 transports, flew a thousand miles to a dry Sahara location, started blasting away, and were ready for the first B-17 24 hours later. Often engineers had to repair and use a captured enemy airfield. The German fields were well-built all-weather operations.

Some of the Japanese island bases, built before the war, had excellent airfields. Most new Japanese installations in the Pacific were ramshackle affairs with poor siting, poor drainage, scant protection, and narrow, bumpy runways. Engineering was a low priority for the offense-minded Japanese, who chronically lacked adequate equipment and imagination. On a few islands, local commanders did improve aircraft shelters and general survivability, as they correctly perceived the danger of coming raids or invasions. In the same theatre the United States Navy's own "construction battalions", collectively named the "Seabees" from the CB acronym adopted on the date of their formation in March 1942, would build over a hundred military airstrips and a significant degree of the military support infrastructure supplying the Pacific "island-hopping" campaign of the Allies during the Pacific war through 1945, as well as elsewhere in the world during the war years.

=== Tactical ===
Tactical air power involves gaining control of the airspace over the battlefield, directly supporting ground units (as by attacks on enemy tanks and artillery), and attacking enemy supply lines and airfields. Typically, fighter planes are used to gain air supremacy, and light bombers are used for support missions.

==== Air supremacy ====
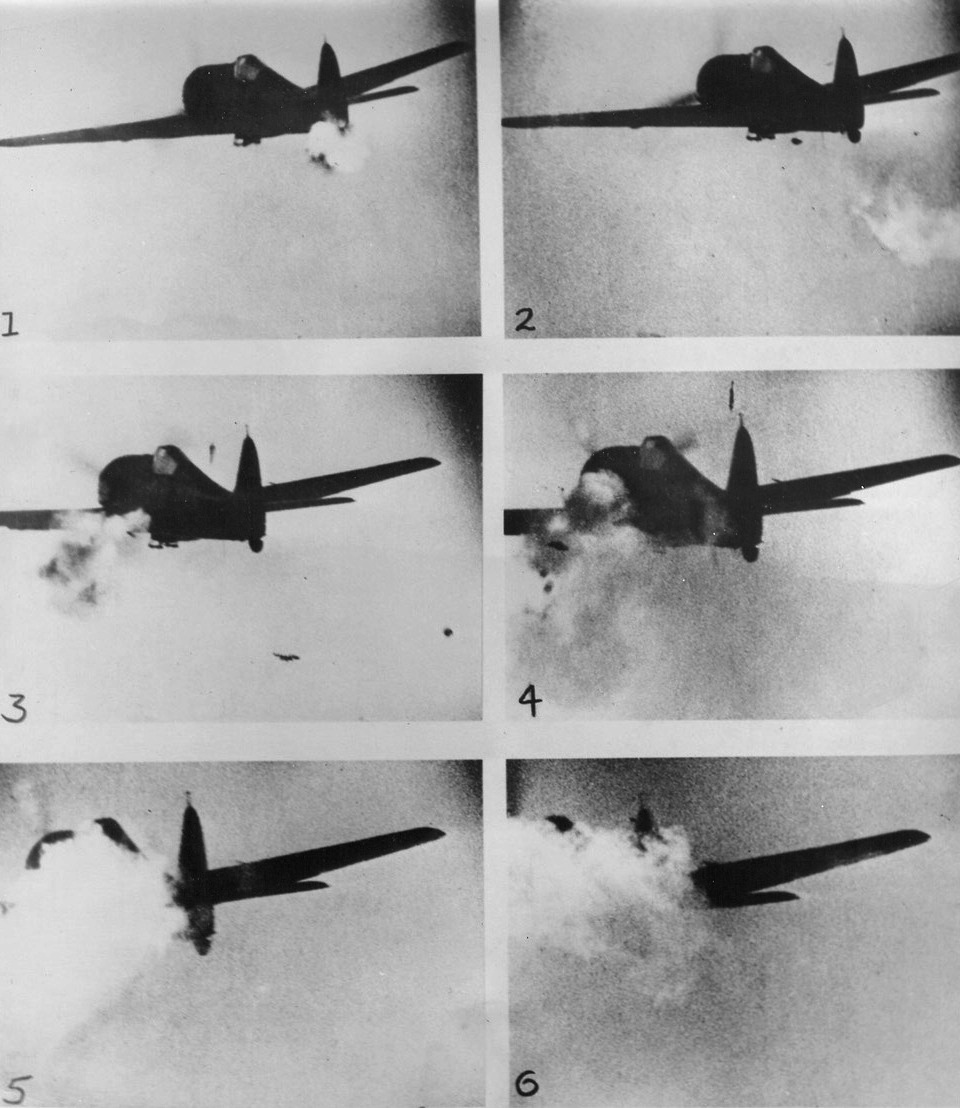
Gun camera photos of a Hawker Typhoon shooting down a Focke-Wulf Fw 190 in 1943

Tactical air doctrine stated that the primary mission was to turn tactical superiority into complete air supremacy—to totally defeat the enemy air force and obtain control of its air space. This could be done directly through dogfights and raids on airfields and radar stations or indirectly by destroying aircraft factories and fuel supplies. Anti-aircraft artillery (called "ack-ack" by the British, "flak" by the Germans, and "Archie" by the World War I USAAS) could also play a role, but it was downgraded by most airmen. The Allies won air supremacy in the Pacific in 1943 and in Europe in 1944. That meant that Allied supplies and reinforcements would get through to the battlefront, but not the enemy's. It meant the Allies could concentrate their strike forces wherever they pleased and overwhelm the enemy with a preponderance of firepower. This was the basic Allied strategy, and it worked.

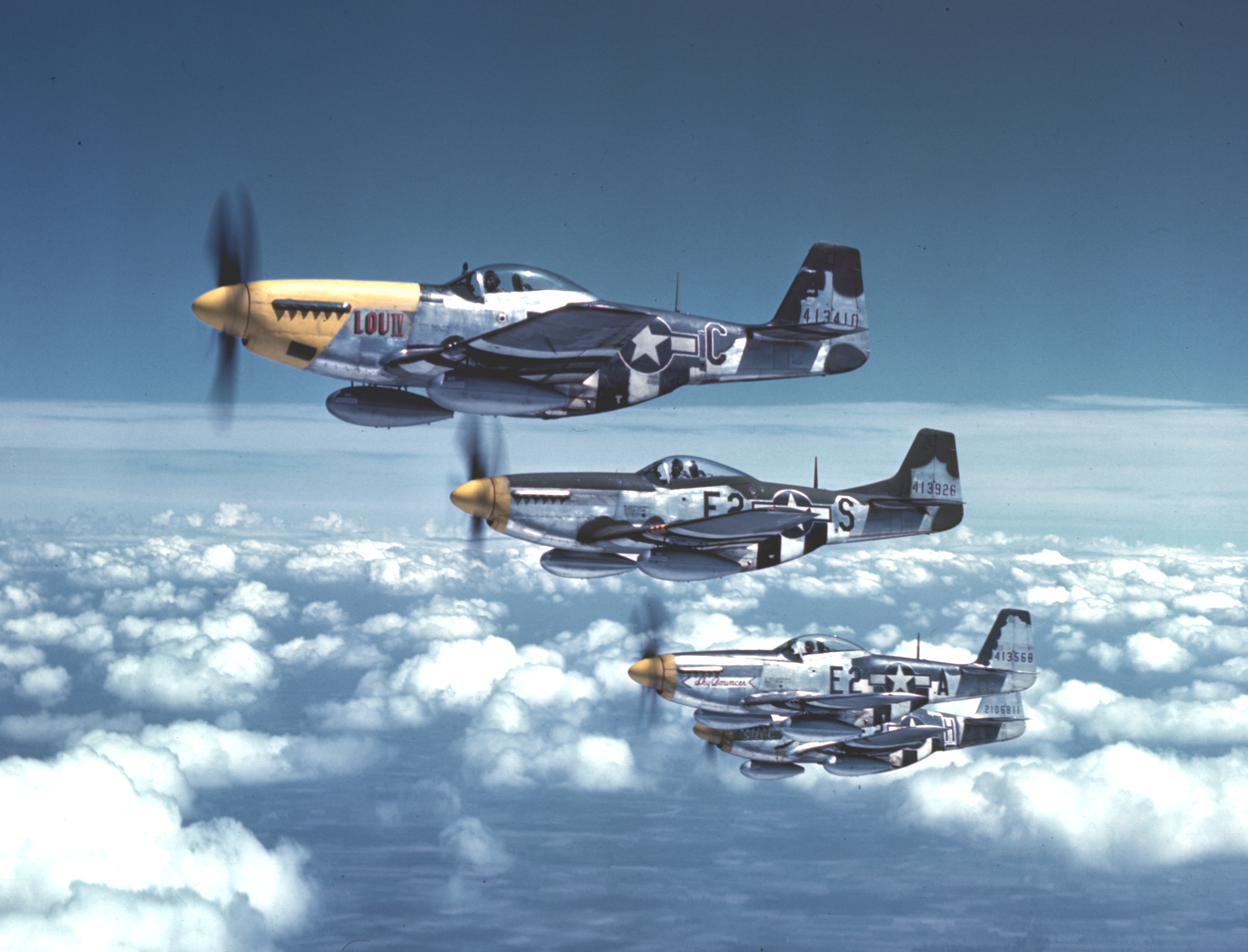
P-51 Mustangs of the 375th Fighter Squadron, Eighth Air Force mid-1944

One of the most effective demonstrations of air supremacy by the Western Allies over Europe occurred in early 1944, when Lieutenant General Jimmy Doolittle, who took command of the US 8th Air Force in January 1944, only a few months later "released" the building force of P-51 Mustangs from their intended mission to closely escort the 8th Air Force's heavy bombers, after getting help from British aviators in selecting the best available aircraft types for the task. The USAAF's Mustang squadrons were then tasked to fly well ahead of the bombers' combat box defensive formations by some 75–100 miles (120–160 km) to basically clear the skies, in the manner of a sizable "fighter sweep" air supremacy mission, of any defensive presence over the Third Reich of the Luftwaffe's Jagdgeschwader single-seat fighter wings. This important change of strategy also coincidentally doomed both the twin-engined Zerstörer heavy fighters and their replacement, heavily armed Focke-Wulf Fw 190A Sturmbock forces used as bomber destroyers, each in their turn. This change in American fighter tactics began to have its most immediate effect with the loss of more and more of the Luftwaffe's Jagdflieger fighter pilot personnel and fewer bomber losses to the Luftwaffe as 1944 wore on.

Air superiority depended on having the fastest, most maneuverable fighters, in sufficient quantity, based on well-supplied airfields, within range. The RAF demonstrated the importance of speed and maneuverability in the Battle of Britain (1940), when its fast Spitfire and Hawker Hurricane fighters easily riddled the clumsy Stukas as they were pulling out of dives. The race to build the fastest fighter became one of the central themes of World War II.

Once total air supremacy in a theatre was gained, the second mission was interdiction of the flow of enemy supplies and reinforcements in a zone five to fifty miles behind the front. Whatever moved had to be exposed to air strikes, or else confined to moonless nights. (Radar was not good enough for nighttime tactical operations against ground targets.) A large fraction of tactical air power focused on this mission.

==== Close air support ====
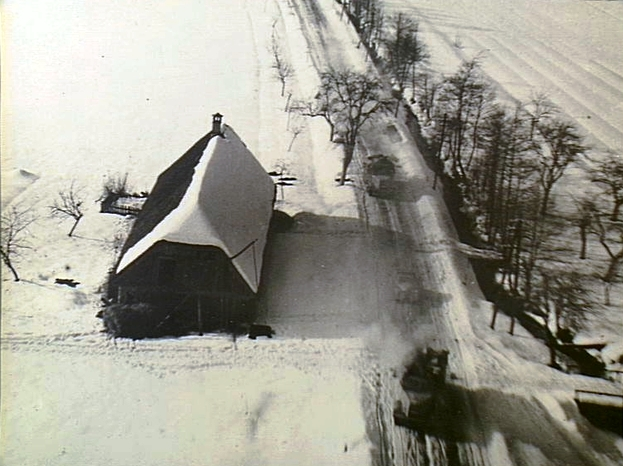
A gun camera photo of a Wehrmacht convoy being strafed by a Balkan Air Force P-51 Mustang in 1945

The third and lowest priority (from the AAF viewpoint) mission was "close air support" or direct assistance to ground units on the battlefront, which consisted of bombing targets identified by ground forces, and strafing exposed infantry. Airmen disliked the mission because it subordinated the air war to the ground war; furthermore, slit trenches, camouflage, and flak guns usually reduced the effectiveness of close air support. "Operation Cobra" in July 1944, targeted a critical strip of 3,000 acres (1,214 ha) of German strength that held up the US breakthrough out of Normandy. General Omar Bradley, his ground forces stymied, placed his bets on air power. 1,500 heavies, 380 medium bombers and 550 fighter bombers dropped 4,000 tons of high explosives. Bradley was horrified when 77 planes dropped their payloads short of the intended target:

"The ground belched, shook and spewed dirt to the sky. Scores of our troops were hit, their bodies flung from slit trenches. Doughboys were dazed and frightened ... A bomb landed squarely on McNair in a slit trench and threw his body sixty feet and mangled it beyond recognition except for the three stars on his collar."

The Germans were stunned senseless, with tanks overturned, telephone wires severed, commanders missing, and a third of their combat troops killed or wounded. The defence line broke; J. Lawton Collins rushed his VII Corps forward; the Germans retreated in a rout; the Battle of France was won; air power seemed invincible. However, the sight of a senior colleague killed by error was unnerving, and after the completion of operation Cobra, Army generals were so reluctant to risk "friendly fire" casualties that they often passed over excellent attack opportunities that would be possible only with air support. Infantrymen, on the other hand, were ecstatic about the effectiveness of close air support:

"Air strikes on the way; we watch from a top window as P-47s dip in and out of clouds through suddenly erupting strings of Christmas-tree lights [flak], before one speck turns over and drops toward earth in the damnest sight of the Second World War, the dive-bomber attack, the speck snarling, screaming, dropping faster than a stone until it's clearly doomed to smash into the earth, then, past the limits of belief, an impossible flattening beyond houses and trees, an upward arch that makes the eyes hurt, and, as the speck hurtles away, WHOOM, the earth erupts five hundred feet up in swirling black smoke. More specks snarl, dive, scream, two squadrons, eight of them, leaving congealing, combining, whirling pillars of black smoke, lifting trees, houses, vehicles, and, we devoutly hope, bits of Germans. We yell and pound each other's backs. Gods from the clouds; this is how you do it! You don't attack painfully across frozen plains, you simply drop in on the enemy and blow them out of existence."

Some forces, especially the United States Marine Corps, emphasized the air-ground team. The airmen, in this approach, also are infantrymen who understand the needs and perspective of the ground forces. There was much more joint air-ground training, and a given air unit might have a long-term relationship with a given ground unit, improving their mutual communications.

In North-West Europe, the Allies used the "taxi-rank" (or "Cab-rank") system for supporting the ground assault. Fighter-bombers, such as the Hawker Typhoon or P-47 Thunderbolt, armed with cannon, bombs and rockets would be in the air at 10,000 ft over the battlefield. When support was required it could be quickly summoned by a ground observer. While often too inaccurate against armoured vehicles, rockets had a psychological effect on troops and were effective against the supply-carrying trucks used to support German tanks.

==== Pioneering use of precision-guided munitions ====
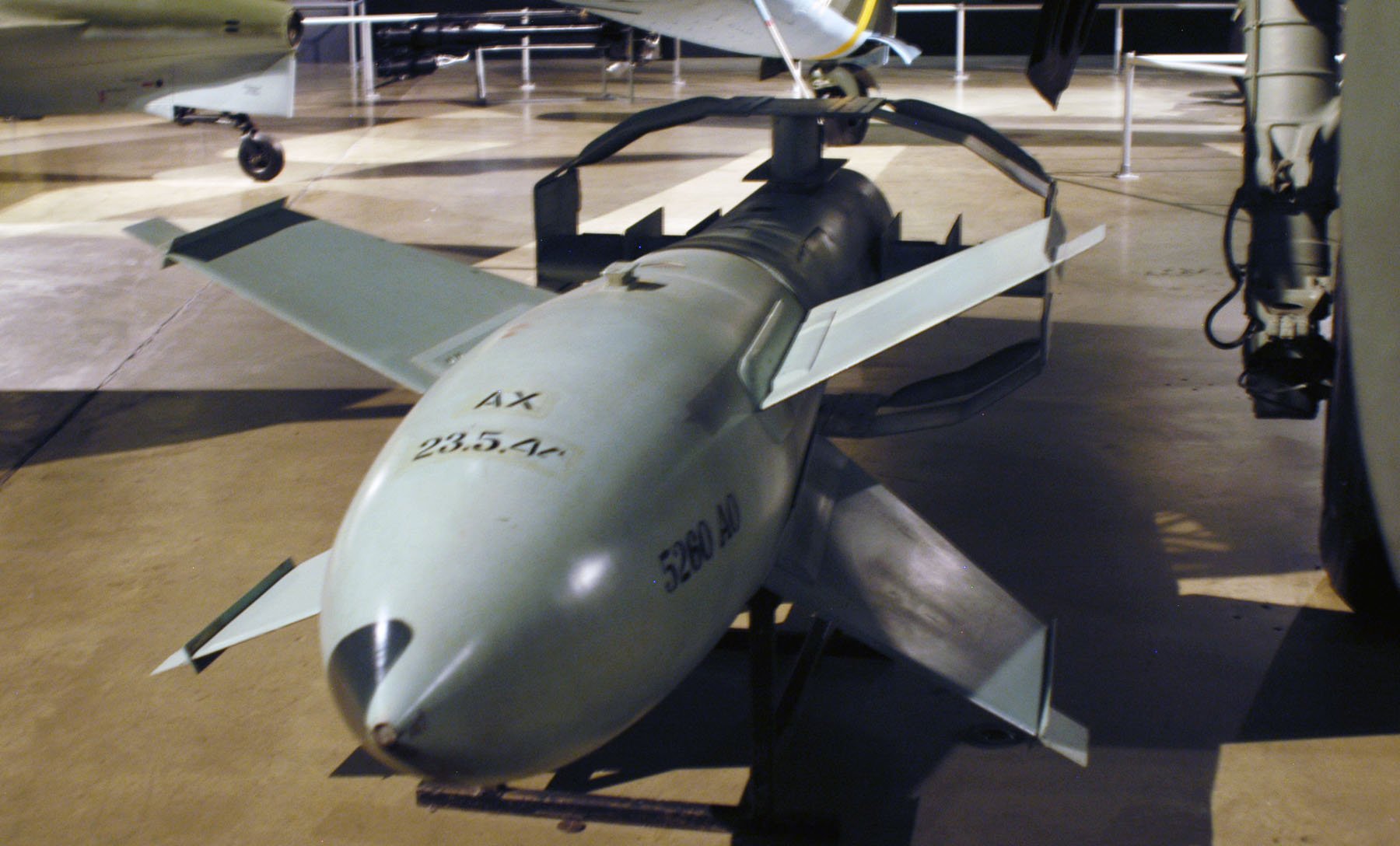
A German Fritz-X glide bomb

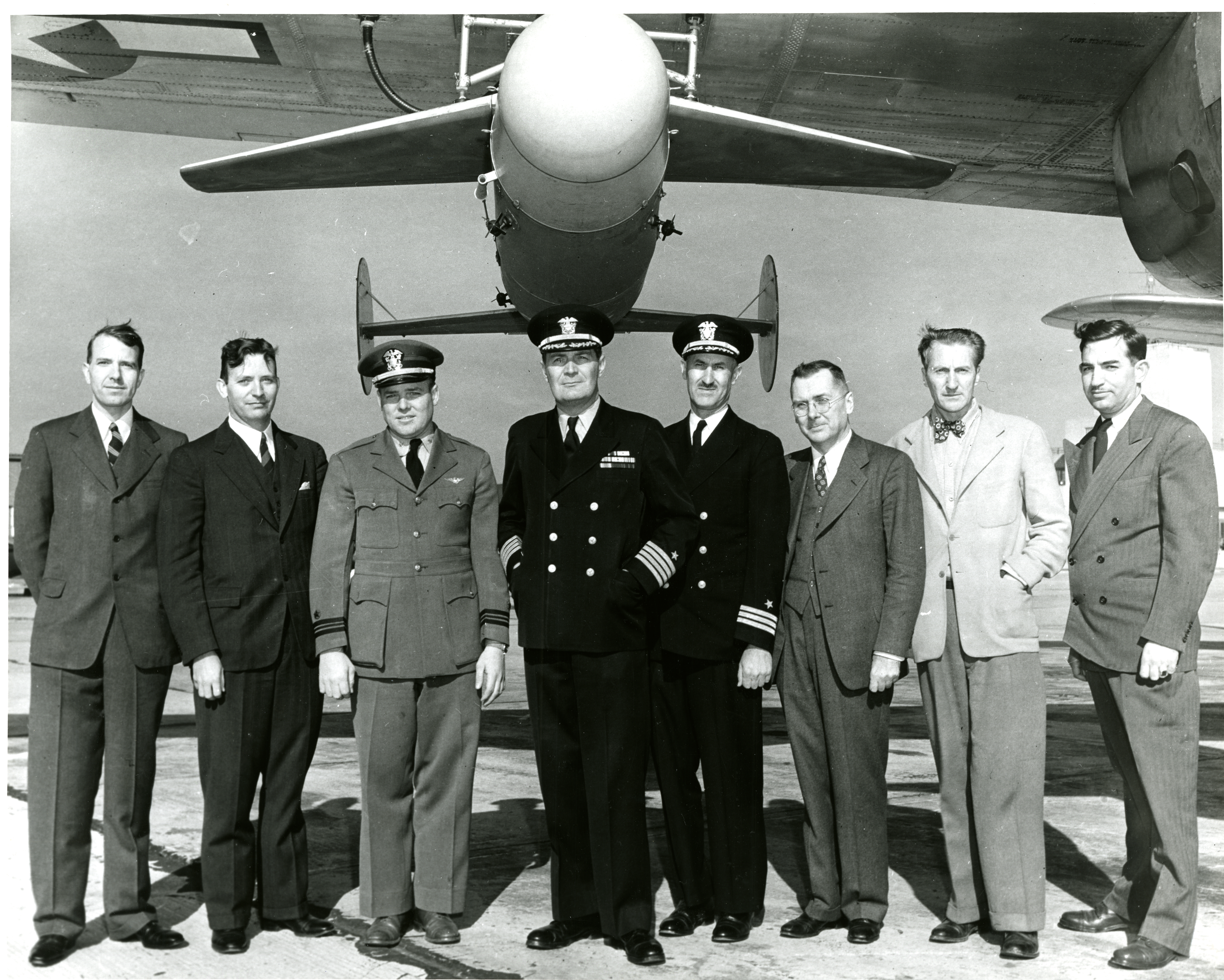
An American Bat anti-ship glide bomb, with its development team

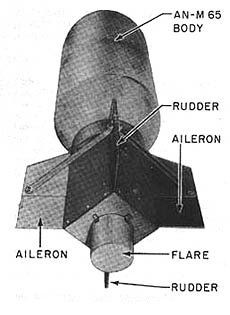
Rear view of an Azon MCLOS-guided bomb, showing details

Both the Luftwaffe and USAAF pioneered the use of what would come to be known as precision-guided munitions during World War II. The Luftwaffe was the first to use such weapons with the Fritz X armor-piercing anti-ship glide bomb on 9 September 1943, against the Italian battleship Roma. III.Gruppe/KG 100's Dornier Do 217 medium bombers achieved two hits, exploding her powder magazines and sinking her. Both the Fritz X and the unarmored, rocket-boosted Henschel Hs 293 guided glide bomb were used successfully against Allied shipping during the Allied invasion of Italy following Italy's capitulation to the Allies earlier in September 1943. Both weapons used the Kehl-Strasbourg radio control link: a joystick-equipped Funkgerät FuG 203 Kehl transmitter in a deploying aircraft, with the corresponding FuG 230 Straßburg receiver in the ordnance for guidance.

The United States Army Air Forces had come up with the Azon guided bomb, converted from a regular 453 kg (1,000 lb.) high explosive bomb with a special set of radio controlled vertical tailfins controlling the lateral path to the target. Missions were flown in both Western Europe in the summer and autumn of 1944, and in the China-Burma-India theatre in early 1945, with two separate B-24 Liberator squadrons, one in each theatre, having some limited success with the device. The U.S. Navy's "Bat" unpowered anti-ship ordnance was based around the same half-ton HE bomb as the Azon, but with the same bomb contained within a much more aerodynamic airframe, and used a fully autonomous onboard radar guidance system to control its flightpath, rather than an external source of control for the Azon.

== German bombers and missiles ==
Britain and the United States built large quantities of four-engined long-range heavy bombers; Germany, Japan, and the Soviet Union did not. The decision was made in 1933 by the German general staff, the technical staff, and the aviation industry that there was a lack of sufficient labor, capital, and raw materials. A top-level Luftwaffe general, Walther Wever, had tried to make some form of strategic bombing capability a priority for the newly formed Luftwaffe through 1935 and into 1936, but his untimely death in June 1936 ended any hopes of developing such a force of long-range "heavies" possible, as his Ural bomber program for such four-engined aircraft, comparable to what the United States was already pioneering, literally died with him. During the war Hitler was insistent on bombers having tactical capability, which at the time meant dive bombing, a maneuver then impossible for any heavy bomber. His aircraft had limited effect on Britain for a variety of reasons, but low payload was among them. Lacking a doctrine of strategic bombing, neither the RLM or the Luftwaffe ever ordered any suitable quantities of an appropriate heavy bomber from the German aviation industry, having only the Heinkel He 177A Greif available for such duties, a design plagued with many technical problems, including an unending series of engine fires, with just under 1,200 examples ever being built. Early in the war, the Luftwaffe had excellent tactical aviation, but when it faced Britain's integrated air defence system, the medium bombers actually designed, produced, and deployed to combat – meant to include the Schnellbomber high-speed mediums, and their intended heavier warload successors, the Bomber B design competition competitors—did not have the numbers or bomb load to do major damage of the sort the RAF and USAAF inflicted on German cities.

=== Failure of German secret weapons ===
Hitler believed that new high-technology "secret weapons" would give Germany a strategic bombing capability and turn the war around. The first of 9,300 V-1 flying bombs hit London in mid-June 1944, and together with 1,300 V-2 rockets, caused 8,000 civilian deaths and 23,000 injuries. Although they did not seriously undercut British morale or munitions production, they bothered the British government a great deal—Germany now had its own unanswered weapons system. Using proximity fuzes, British anti-aircraft artillery gunners learned how to shoot down the 400 mph V-1s; nothing could stop the supersonic V-2s. The British government, in near panic, demanded that upwards of 40% of bomber sorties be targeted against the launch sites, and got its way in "Operation Crossbow". The attacks were futile, and the diversion represented a major success for Hitler.

Every raid against a V-1 or V-2 launch site was one less raid against the Third Reich. On the whole, however, the secret weapons were still another case of too little too late. The Luftwaffe ran the V-1 program, which used a jet engine, but it diverted scarce engineering talent and manufacturing capacity that were urgently needed to improve German radar, air defence, and jet fighters. The German Army ran the V-2 program. The rockets were a technological triumph, and bothered the British leadership even more than the V-1s. But they were so inaccurate they rarely could hit militarily significant targets.

== Second Sino-Japanese War ==
=== China, 1937–1945 ===
The airwar over China were the largest air battles fought since the Great War, involving the first prolonged and massed-deployments of aircraft carriers in support of expeditionary forces, extensive close-air support and air-interdiction strikes, significant use of airpower in the attacks against naval assets, and much of the technological and operational transitioning from the latest biplane fighter designs to the modern monoplane fighter designs. Although largely a forgotten war by Western standards, the significance and impact of the airwar between China and the Empire of Japan cannot be denied; it should've been the best opportunity for the Western air powers to learn about the might of Japanese aerial and naval military technological prowess, as the West were yet in for a dangerous realization of Japanese air power by the end of 1941, when the Empire of Japan expanded into the Pacific.

As the War of Resistance-World War II broke out with the Battle of Shanghai in 1937, the centralized command of the Republic of China Air Force had integrated various former-warlord air force men and machines, as well as overseas-Chinese volunteer aviators into the nominally Nationalist Air Force of China, and coordinating with the Second United Front of the National Revolutionary Army (NRA) and People's Liberation Army (PLA), engaging in massive air-battles, close-air support operations, air-interdiction strikes, facing indiscriminate terror-bombing campaigns against all manners of civilian targets inflicted by the Imperial Japanese Army Air Service and the Imperial Japanese Navy Air Service. The Chinese Air Force equipped with a maximum of only about 300 imported operational combat aircraft at any given time, was stretched thin over a massive area of the northern, eastern, and southern fronts against approximately 1,000 operational combat aircraft of the Imperial Japanese forces supported by their own robust and rapidly developing aviation industry.

Major air battles and skirmishes between the Chinese Air Force and the Japanese Army and Navy air forces continued over a vast range of mainland China, and beyond, even after the Battle of Shanghai, Battle of Nanking and Battle of Taiyuan were lost by the end of 1937, new frontlines were quickly being drawn at the Battle of Taierzhuang, the Battle of Wuhan, the Battle of Canton, the Battle of South Guangxi/Kunlun Pass, among very many other engagements through 1938 and into 1939.

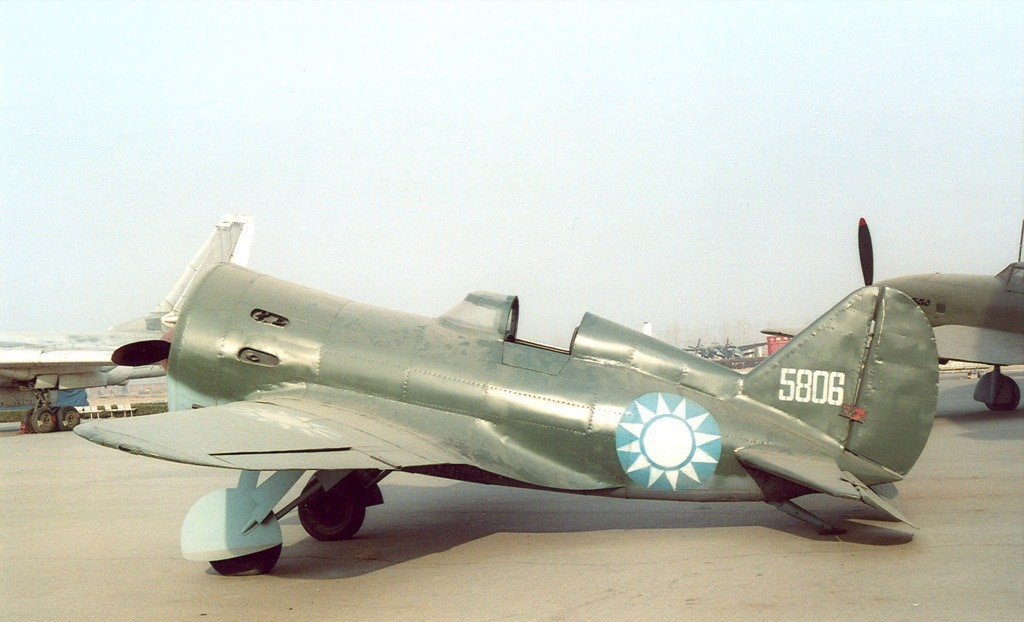
The Chinese Air Force survived to fight with combat aircraft replenishments from 1937 to 1941 through treaty with the Soviets; here a Chinese Polikarpov I-16 fighter preserved at the Datangshan Aviation Museum

The Chinese Air Force was initially equipped with a mixed-bag of fighter and bomber aircraft at the beginning of the war in 1937 that included the Boeing Model 281 (Peashooter), Curtiss A-12 Shrikes, Curtiss Hawk IIs/Hawk IIIs, Fiat CR.32s, Heinkel He 111s, Martin B-10s, Northrop Gammas, etc., and while giving good account in their many missions against the Imperial Japanese onslaught, these were mostly lost through continued attrition as the war raged on through the end of 1937. The Chinese Air Force however would continue to fight on for years to come as they were replenished through the Sino-Soviet Non-Aggression Pact of 1937, and transitioning almost entirely into Soviet-made Polikarpov I-15, I-153 and I-16 fighters as well as Tupolev SB-2 and TB-3 bombers by 1938. Fighting capacity was greatly bolstered with support from the aviators of the Soviet Volunteer Group, which was active from late 1937 until the end of 1939, and remained stationed in China at limited capacity until December 1940. The Chinese would remain with these increasingly obsolescent aircraft as the Japanese made tremendous advancements in aircraft and engine technologies.

=== Air war stalemate at the national fortress of Chongqing ===
With the fall of Wuhan/Hubei province to the Japanese, the wartime capital of China had been pushed back to Chongqing, where an all-air war campaign against targets in Sichuan province between the CAF and the IJAAF/IJNAF would rage for years in a cat and mouse game under the codenames Operation 100, 101 and 102 IJA/IJN "joint-strike force" terror-bombing campaigns. Despite the general obsolescence of the Chinese fighter aircraft against the new Japanese Schnellbombers, the CAF improvised, continuing to inflict casualties and losses against the Japanese raiders, culminating with the well-timed deployment of experimental air-burst bombs launched against the massive heavy bomber formations in August 1940, and climaxing with the introduction of the most advanced fighter aircraft of the time: the Mitsubishi A6M "Zero", which gained almost complete air-supremacy with its unheard-of performance against the Chinese Air Force the following month, and would incredibly remain largely unheard-of almost a year and a half later when the allied air powers faced the scourge of the Zero fighter as the Imperial Japanese war machine expanded into the Pacific with the attack on Pearl Harbor.

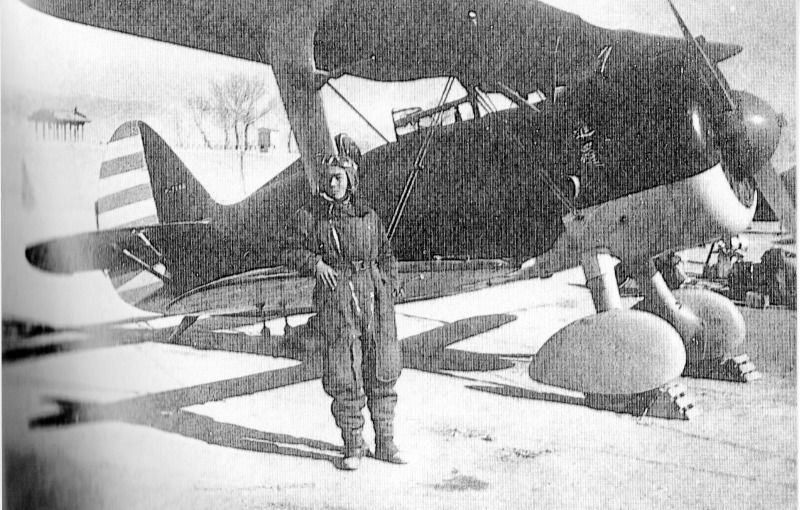
Xu Jixiang of the 17th PS, 5th PG with an I-15bis; the fighter he fought in the A6M Zero fighter's debut aerial-combat engagement on 13 September 1940 over Chongqing

In June 1941, China was included into the Lend-Lease Act which stipulated that the United States will help support the Chinese Air Force with U.S. warplanes; an aggressive air campaign against Japan using Chinese bases with American pilots wearing Chinese uniforms was officially established on 10 October 1941. Aircrews and specialized personnel from the United States began arriving in the CBI theater to form the American Volunteer Group of combat aviators, popularly referred to as the "Flying Tigers", a nominally Chinese Air Force unit composed almost entirely of Americans, led by General Claire Lee Chennault. Tasked with the defense of "The Hump" supply-lifeline between the British bases in Burma (Myanmar) and India, and the wartime port-of-entry into China, Kunming city, the Flying Tigers employed dissimilar hit-and-run air-tactics using the heavy-firepower and high-speed diving of the well-armored P-40 Warhawk fighter-attack planes, racking up a strong record against the Japanese Army Air Force operating in the CBI theater of operations beginning in December 1941. Chennault called for strategic bombing against Japanese cities, using American bombers based in China. The plan was approved by Roosevelt and top policy makers in Washington, and equipment was on the way in December 1941. It proved to be futile. American strategic bombing of Japan from Chinese bases began in 1944, including the firebombing of Wuhan, using Boeing B-29 Superfortress under the command of General Curtis Lemay, but the distances and the logistics made an effective campaign impossible.

== Pacific air war ==
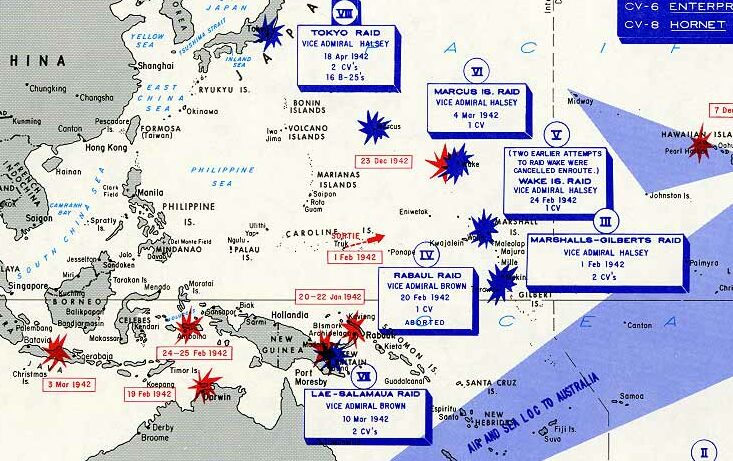
Carrier warfare in Pacific Dec 1941 – Mar 1942

Japan did not have a separate air force. Its aviation units were integrated into the Army and Navy, which were not well coordinated with each other. Japanese military aircraft production during World War II produced 76,000 warplanes, of which 30,000 were fighters and 15,000 were light bombers.

=== Japanese air war 1941–42 ===
Washington tried to deter Japanese entry into the war by threatening the firebombing of Japanese cities using B-17 strategic bombers based in the Philippines. The US sent too little too late, as the Japanese easily overwhelmed the American "Far Eastern Air Force" the day after Pearl Harbor.

Japanese naval air power proved unexpectedly powerful, sinking the American battleship fleet at Pearl Harbor in December 1941, then raging widely across the Pacific and Indian oceans to defeat elements of the British, American, Dutch, and Australian forces. Land-based airpower, coordinated efficiently with land forces, enabled Japan to overrun Malaya, Singapore, and the Philippines by spring 1942.

The Doolittle Raid used 16 B-25 bombers (taking off from aircraft carriers) to bomb Tokyo in April 1942. Little physical damage was done, but the episode shocked and stunned the Japanese people and leadership.

=== 1942 ===
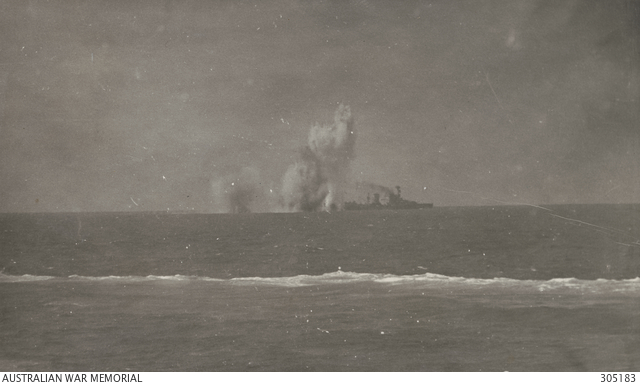
Japanese warplanes bombing the Dutch light cruiser HNLMS Java during the Battle of Java Sea

At the Battle of the Java Sea, 27 February 1942, the Japanese Navy destroyed the main ABDA (American, British, Dutch, and Australian) naval force. The Netherlands East Indies campaign resulted in the surrender of Allied forces on Java. Meanwhile, Japanese aircraft had all but eliminated Allied air power in South-East Asia and began attacking Australia, with a major raid on Darwin, 19 February. A raid by a powerful Japanese Navy aircraft carrier force into the Indian Ocean resulted in the Battle of Ceylon and sinking of a British carrier, HMS Hermes, as well as two cruisers and other ships, effectively driving the British fleet out of the Indian Ocean and paving the way for Japanese conquest of Burma and a drive towards India.

The Japanese seemed unstoppable. However, the Doolittle Raid caused an uproar in the Japanese Army and Navy commands—they had both lost face in letting the Emperor be threatened. As a consequence, the Army relocated overseas fighter groups to Japan, groups needed elsewhere. Even more significantly, the Naval command believed it had to extend its eastern defence perimeter, and they focused on Midway as the next base.

==== Coral Sea and Midway ====
By mid-1942, the Japanese Combined Fleet found itself holding a vast area, even though it lacked the aircraft carriers, aircraft, and aircrew to defend it, and the freighters, tankers, and destroyers necessary to sustain it. Moreover, Fleet doctrine was incompetent to execute the proposed "barrier" defense. Instead, they decided on additional attacks in both the south and central Pacific. In the Battle of the Coral Sea, fought between 4–8 May 1942 off the coast of Australia, the opposing fleets never saw one another; it was an air exchange. While the Americans had greater losses and arguably a tactical loss (having lost a fleet carrier while sinking a Japanese light carrier), they gained a strategic victory, as Japan cancelled a planned offensive. Most critically, the damage to one of the Japanese fleet carriers and the other carrier's airgroup would leave both carriers out of the Battle of Midway, preventing them from them bringing their 144 aircraft (at full strength) to supplement the Japanese carrier force. This would allow the American forces to be at near-parity temporarily, setting the stage for the turning point of the Pacific War.

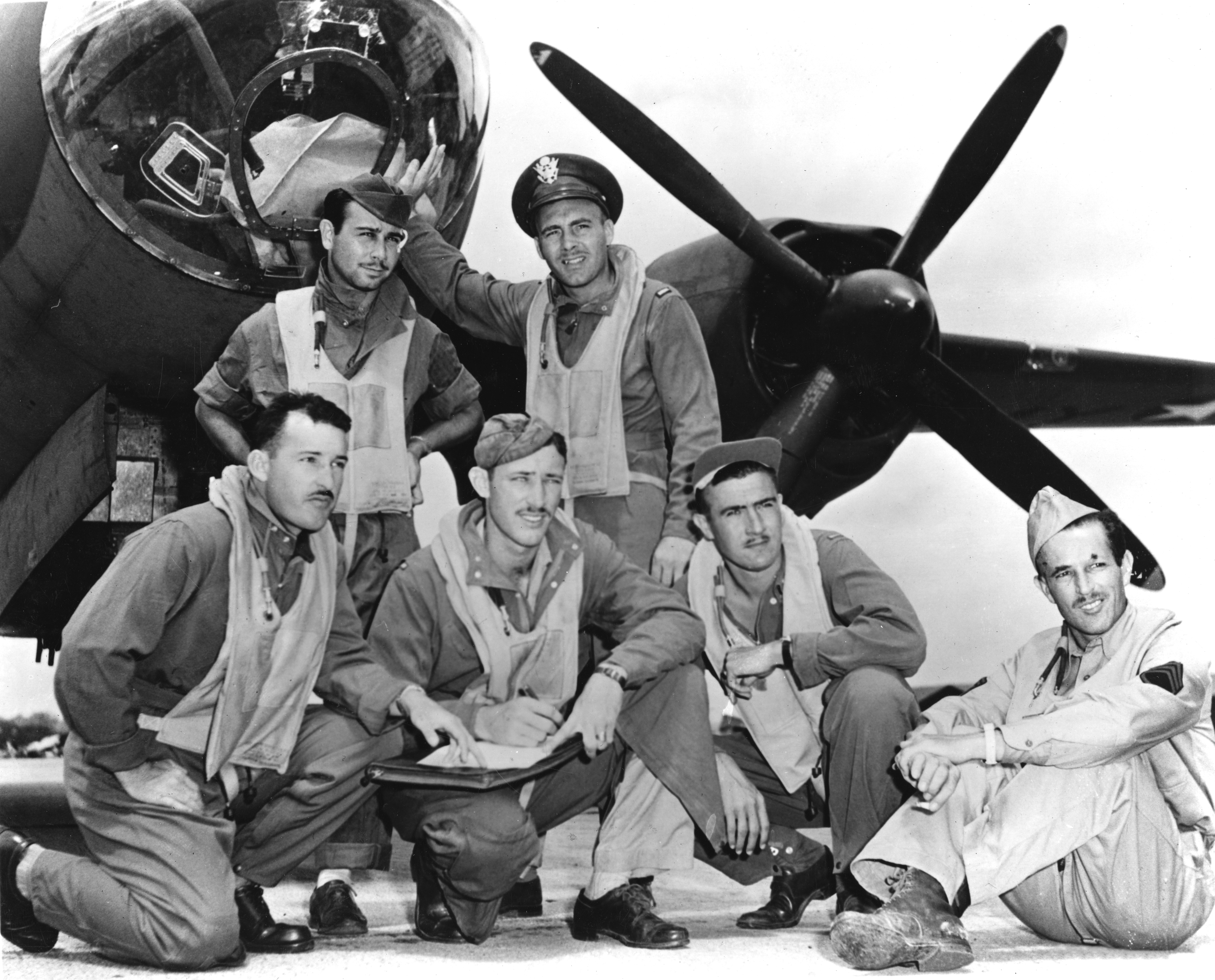
B-26 crew at Midway Island

In the Battle of Midway, the Japanese split a portion of their fleet toward the Aleutians in a simultaneous operation, as well as separating the majority of its surface force from the Japanese carriers. The Americans, on the other hand, had received critical details of the Midway operation due to a cryptographic breakthrough, which included dates and a complete order of battle. As such, American forces were able to ambush the Japanese carriers. On the other hand, the Japanese expected American carriers to sail from Pearl Harbor after Midway had been attacked; the unexpected presence of American carriers would lead to the early tactical mistakes the Japanese commander would make. Japan had 272 warplanes operating from four carriers; the U.S. Navy carriers had 233 aircraft, but there were also another 115 AAF and Marine land-based aircraft on Midway itself. Due to tactical errors by the Japanese commander and the lucky breaks in executing the decisive American attack (in addition to the skill of the American aviators and commanders), the Japanese lost three of their four carriers early in the battle. The decisive attack was two simultaneous (unplanned) dive bomber attacks arriving after approximately ninety minutes of constant harassment from various American land and naval air squadrons. This harassment had left the Japanese combat air patrol out of position, especially as the combat air patrol was focused on an on-going torpedo bomber attack. The harassment had also prevented the Japanese carriers from launching a strike on the American carriers, and the three Japanese carriers were sunk having only made one, ineffective attack against Midway itself. The final fourth carrier would be sunk by the end of the day. The fourth carrier, however, managed to cripple one American carrier, which would later be sunk by a submarine. Having lost all their carriers, the Japanese were forced to retreat, unable to use the rest of their surface fleet (including the battleships) without air cover. Having lost all but two of their fleet carriers (the ones damaged at Coral Sea), the Japanese never again launched a major, effective offensive in the Pacific. The successes of the Japanese naval air arm, having won stunning victories for the Japanese navy in the first-half of 1942, came to a sharp stop after the Battle of Midway.

==== Guadalcanal ====
The Japanese had built a major air base on the island of Rabaul, but had difficulty keeping it supplied. American naval and Marine aviation made Rabaul a frequent bombing target.

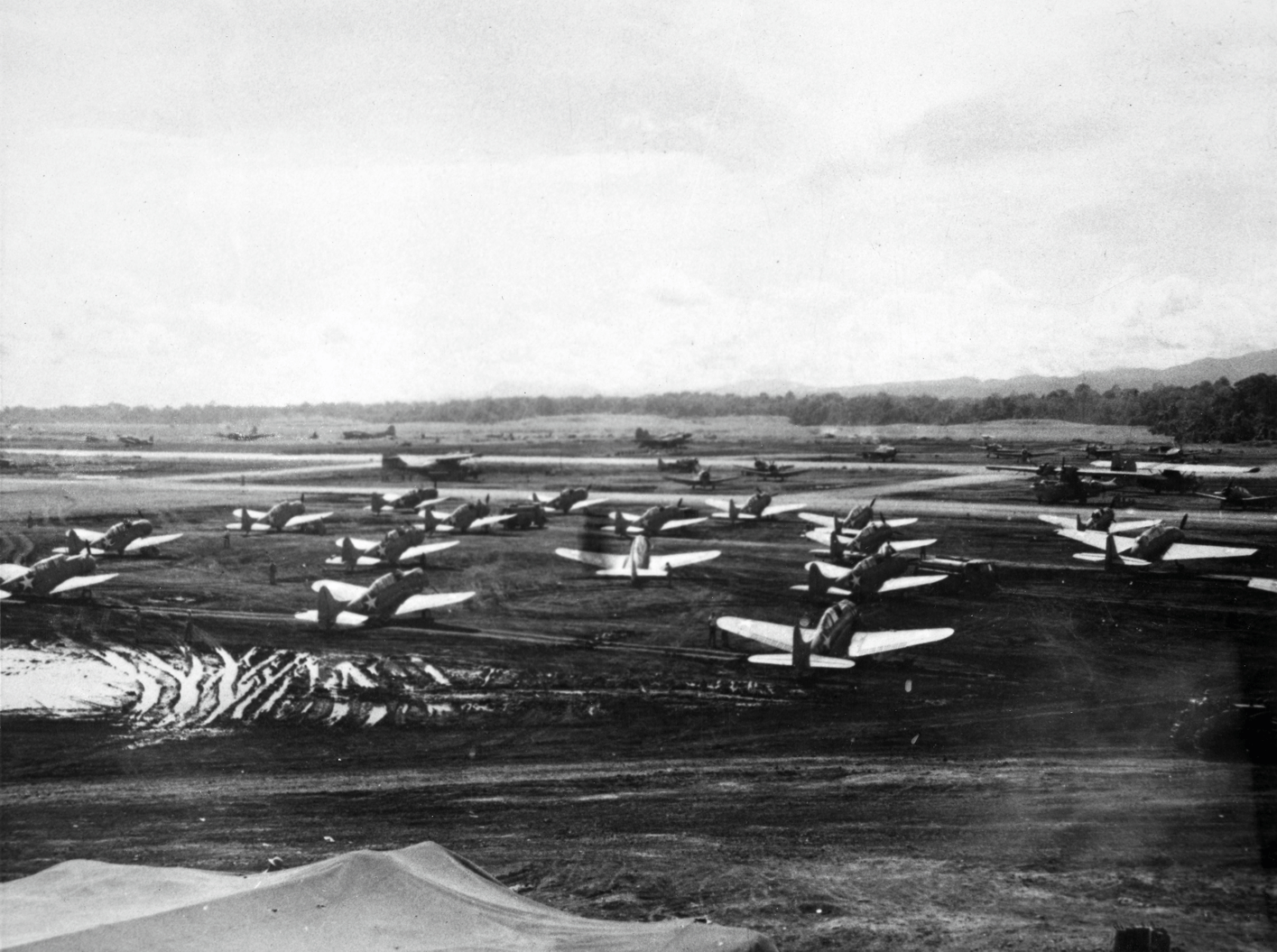
Cactus Air Force warplanes on Henderson Field, Guadalcanal in October 1942

A Japanese airfield was spotted under construction at Guadalcanal. The Americans made an amphibious landing in August 1942 to seize it, sent in the Cactus Air Force, and started to reverse the tide of Japanese conquests. As a result, Japanese and Allied forces both occupied various parts of Guadalcanal. Over the following six months, both sides fed resources into an escalating battle of attrition on the island, at sea, and in the sky, with eventual victory going to the Americans in February 1943. It was a campaign the Japanese could ill afford. A majority of Japanese aircraft from the entire South Pacific area was drained into the Japanese defence of Guadalcanal. Japanese logistics, as happened time and again, failed; only 20% of the supplies dispatched from Rabaul to Guadalcanal ever reached there.

=== 1943–1945 ===
After 1942, the United States made a massive effort to build up its aviation forces in the Pacific, and began island-hopping to push its airfields closer and closer to Tokyo. Meanwhile, the Japanese were unable to upgrade their aircraft, and they fell further and further behind in numbers of aircraft carriers. The forward island bases were very hard to supply—often only submarines could get through—and the Japanese forces worked without replacements or rest, and often with inadequate food and medicine. Their morale and performance steadily declined. Starvation became an issue in many bases.

The American airmen were well-fed and well-supplied, but they were not rotated and faced increasingly severe stress that caused their performance to deteriorate. They flew far more often in the Southwest Pacific than in Europe, and although rest time in Australia was scheduled, there was no fixed number of missions that would produce transfer back to the States. Coupled with the monotonous, hot, disease-ridden environment, the result was bad morale that jaded veterans quickly passed along to newcomers. After a few months, epidemics of combat fatigue would drastically reduce the efficiency of units. The men who had been at jungle airfields longest, the flight surgeons reported, were in the worst shape:

Many have chronic dysentery or other disease, and almost all show chronic fatigue states ... They appear listless, unkempt, careless, and apathetic with almost masklike facial expression. Speech is slow, thought content is poor, they complain of chronic headaches, insomnia, memory defect, feel forgotten, worry about themselves, are afraid of new assignments, have no sense of responsibility, and are hopeless about the future.

=== Strategic bombing of Japan ===
The flammability of Japan's large cities, and the concentration of munitions production there, made strategic bombing the preferred strategy of the Americans. The first efforts were made from bases in China. Massive efforts (costing $4.5 billion) to establish B-29 bases there had failed when in 1944 the Japanese Army simply moved overland and captured them. The Marianas (especially the islands of Saipan and Tinian), captured in June 1944, gave a close, secure base for the very-long-range B-29. The "Superfortress" (the B-29) represented the highest achievement of traditional (pre-jet) aeronautics. Its four 2,200 horsepower Wright R-3350 supercharged engines could lift four tons of bombs 3,500 miles at 33,000 feet (high above Japanese flak or fighters). Computerized fire-control mechanisms made its 13 guns exceptionally lethal against fighters. However, the systematic raids that began in June 1944, were unsatisfactory, because the AAF had learned too much in Europe; it overemphasised self-defence. Arnold, in personal charge of the campaign (bypassing the theatre commanders) brought in a new leader, General Curtis LeMay. In early 1945, LeMay ordered a radical change in tactics: remove the machine guns and gunners, fly in low at night. (Much fuel was used to get to 30,000 feet; it could now be replaced with more bombs.) The Japanese radar, fighter, and anti-aircraft systems were so ineffective that they could not hit the bombers. Fires raged through the cities, and millions of civilians fled to the mountains.

Tokyo was hit repeatedly and first suffered a serious blow with the Operation Meetinghouse raid on the night of 9/10 March 1945, a conflagration that destroyed nearly 270,000 buildings over a 16 square mile (41 km^{2}) area, killing at least 83,000, and estimated by some to be the single most destructive bombing raid in military history. On 5 June, 51,000 buildings in four miles of Kobe were burned out by 473 B-29s; Japanese opposition was fierce, as 11 B-29s went down and 176 were damaged. Osaka, where one-sixth of the Empire's munitions were made, was hit by 1,733 tons of incendiaries dropped by 247 B-29s. A firestorm burned out 8.1 square miles, including 135,000 houses; 4,000 died. The Japanese local officials reported:

Although damage to big factories was slight, approximately one-fourth of some 4,000 lesser factories, which operated hand-in-hand with the big factories, were completely destroyed by fire ... Moreover, owing to the rising fear of air attacks, workers in general were reluctant to work in the factories, and the attendance fluctuated as much as 50 percent.

The Japanese army, which was not based in the cities, was largely undamaged by the raids. The Army was short of food and gasoline, but, as Iwo Jima and Okinawa proved, it was capable of ferocious resistance. The Japanese also had a new tactic that it hoped would provide the bargaining power to get a satisfactory peace, the Kamikaze.

==== Kamikaze ====
In late 1944, the Japanese invented an unexpected and highly effective new tactic, the Kamikaze suicide plane aimed like a guided missile at American ships. Kamikaze means 'divine wind', a reference to the hurricane that sunk an invading Mongol force in 1274. The attacks began in October 1944 and continued to the end of the war. Most of the aircraft used in kamikaze attacks were converted obsolete fighters and dive-bombers. The quality of construction was very poor, and many crashed during training or before reaching targets. Experienced pilots were used to lead a mission because they could navigate; they were not Kamikazes, and they returned to base for another mission. The Kamikaze pilots were inexperienced and had minimal training; however most were well-educated and intensely committed to the Emperor.

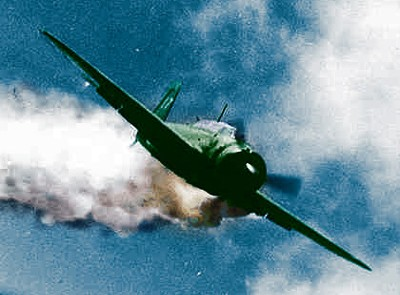
A stricken Yokosuka D4Y in a suicide dive against USS Essex in 1944

Kamikaze attacks were highly effective at the Battle of Okinawa in Spring 1945. During the three-month battle, 4,000 kamikaze sorties sank 38 US ships and damaged 368 more, killing 4,900 sailors in the American 5th Fleet. Destroyers and destroyer escorts, doing radar picket duty, were hit hard, as the inexperienced pilots dived at the first American ship they spotted instead of waiting to get at the big carriers. Task Force 58 analyzed the Japanese technique at Okinawa in April 1945:

"Rarely have the enemy attacks been so cleverly executed and made with such reckless determination. These attacks were generally by single or few aircraft making their approaches with radical changes in course and altitude, dispersing when intercepted and using cloud cover to every advantage. They tailed our friendlies home, used decoy planes, and came in at any altitude or on the water."

The Americans decided their best defense against Kamikazes was to knock them out on the ground, or else in the air long before they approached the fleet. The Navy called for more fighters and more warning. The carriers replaced a fourth of their light bombers with Marine fighters; back home the training of fighter pilots was stepped up. More combat air patrols circling the big ships, more radar picket ships (which themselves became prime targets), and more attacks on airbases and gasoline supplies eventually worked. Japan suspended Kamikaze attacks in May 1945, because it was now hoarding gasoline and hiding planes in preparation for new suicide attacks in case the Allied forces tried to invade their home islands.

The Kamikaze strategy allowed the use of untrained pilots and obsolete planes, and since evasive maneuvering was dropped and there was no return trip, the scarce gasoline reserves could be stretched further. Since pilots guided their airplane like a guided missile all the way to the target, the proportion of hits was much higher than in ordinary bombing, and would eventually see the introduction of a purpose-built, air-launched rocket-powered suicide aircraft design in small numbers to accomplish such missions against U.S. Navy ships. Japan's industry was manufacturing 1,500 new planes a month in 1945.

Toward the end of the war, the Japanese press encouraged civilians to emulate the kamikaze pilots who willingly gave their lives to stop American naval forces. Civilians were told that the reward for such behavior was enshrinement as a warrior-god and spiritual protection in the afterlife.

Expecting increased resistance, including far more Kamikaze attacks once the main islands of Japan were invaded, the U.S. high command rethought its strategy and used atomic bombs to end the war, hoping it would make a costly invasion unnecessary.

==== Atomic bombings of Hiroshima and Nagasaki ====
The air attacks on Japan had crippled her ability to wage war but the Japanese had not surrendered. On 26 July 1945, United States President Harry S. Truman, United Kingdom Prime Minister Winston Churchill, and Chairman of the Chinese Nationalist Government Chiang Kai-shek issued the Potsdam Declaration, which outlined the terms of surrender for the Empire of Japan as agreed upon at the Potsdam Conference. This ultimatum stated if Japan did not surrender, she would face "prompt and utter destruction". The Japanese government ignored this ultimatum (Mokusatsu, "kill by silence"), and vowed to continue resisting an anticipated Allied invasion of Japan. On 6 August 1945, the "Little Boy" enriched uranium atomic bomb was dropped on the city of Hiroshima, followed on 9 August by the detonation of the "Fat Man" plutonium core atomic bomb over Nagasaki. Both cities were destroyed with enormous loss of life and psychological shock. On 15 August, Emperor Hirohito announced the surrender of Japan, stating:

"Moreover, the enemy has begun to employ a new and most cruel bomb, the power of which to do damage is indeed incalculable, taking the toll of many innocent lives. Should We continue to fight, it would not only result in an ultimate collapse and obliteration of the Japanese nation, but also it would lead to the total extinction of human civilization. Such being the case, how are We to save the millions of Our subjects; or to atone Ourselves before the hallowed spirits of Our Imperial Ancestors? This is the reason why We have ordered the acceptance of the provisions of the Joint Declaration of the Powers."

== Europe, 1939–1941 ==
The Luftwaffe gained significant combat experience in the Spanish Civil War, where it was used to provide close air support for infantry units. The success of the Luftwaffe's Ju 87 Stuka dive bombers in the blitzkriegs that shattered Poland in 1939 and France in 1940, gave Berlin inordinate confidence in its air force. Military professionals could not ignore the effectiveness of the Stuka, but also observed that France and Poland had minimal effective air defence. Outside Britain, the idea of an integrated air defence system had not emerged; most militaries had a conflict between the advocates of anti-aircraft artillery and fighter aircraft for defence, not recognizing that they could be complementary, when under a common system of command and control; a system that had a common operational picture of the battle in progress.

=== Invasion of Poland ===
Ju 87 diving procedure

Luftwaffe aircraft closely supported the advance of the Army mechanized units, most notably with dive bombers, but also with light observation aircraft, such as Fieseler Storch, that rapidly corrected the aim of artillery, and gave commanders a literal overview of the battle. Allied analysts noted that Poland lacked an effective air defence, and was trying to protect too large an area.

=== France and the Low Countries; Dunkirk ===
German air-ground coordination was also evident in the 1940 German campaign in the Low Countries and France. The continental air defences were not well-organized.

The Germans deployed among others the tri-motor Ju 52 transport for airborne troops in the attack on the Netherlands on 10 May 1940. The first large-scale air attack with paratroops in history subsequently occurred during the Battle for The Hague. No fewer than 295 Ju 52s were lost in that venture and in other parts of the country, due to varying circumstances, among which were accurate and effective Dutch anti-aircraft defences and German mistakes in using soggy airfields not able to support the heavy aircraft. Thus, almost an entire year's production was lost in the Netherlands. These losses were never surpassed in any air battle in history. The lack of sufficient numbers of aircraft most probably heavily influenced the decision not to invade England following the Battle of Britain. In total, the Germans lost over 2,000 planes in the continuous air war over the Netherlands. This high number can also be attributed to the main Allied air lanes into Germany, that led directly over the Netherlands. Altogether, over 5,000 aircraft were lost over the Netherlands (Allied and German), and over 20,000 crew lost their lives in these mishaps. Most of these crew were buried locally, so that the Netherlands has some 600 places where Allied and Nazi airmen are buried. This makes the country the densest burial place for air crew in all of Europe.

Losses over the Netherlands 1939–1945 Allied – German

- Fighters 1,273 – 1,175
- Bombers 2,164 – 454
- Sea planes; recce 88 – 85
- Transports 132 – 286*
- TOTAL (incl. misc.) 3,667 – 2,017 (total 5.684).

(*: 274 of these on 10 May 1940)

While German aircraft inflicted heavy losses at the Battle of Dunkirk, and soldiers awaiting evacuation, while under attack, bitterly asked "Where was the Royal Air Force?", the RAF had been operating more effectively than other air defences in the field, meeting the German attacks before they reached the battlefield.

=== Battle of Britain ===
Air superiority or supremacy was a prerequisite to Operation Sea Lion, the planned German invasion of Britain. The Luftwaffe's primary task was intended to be the destruction of the Royal Air Force (RAF). The warplanes on both sides were comparable. Germany had more planes, but they used much of their fuel getting to Britain, and so had more limited time for combat.

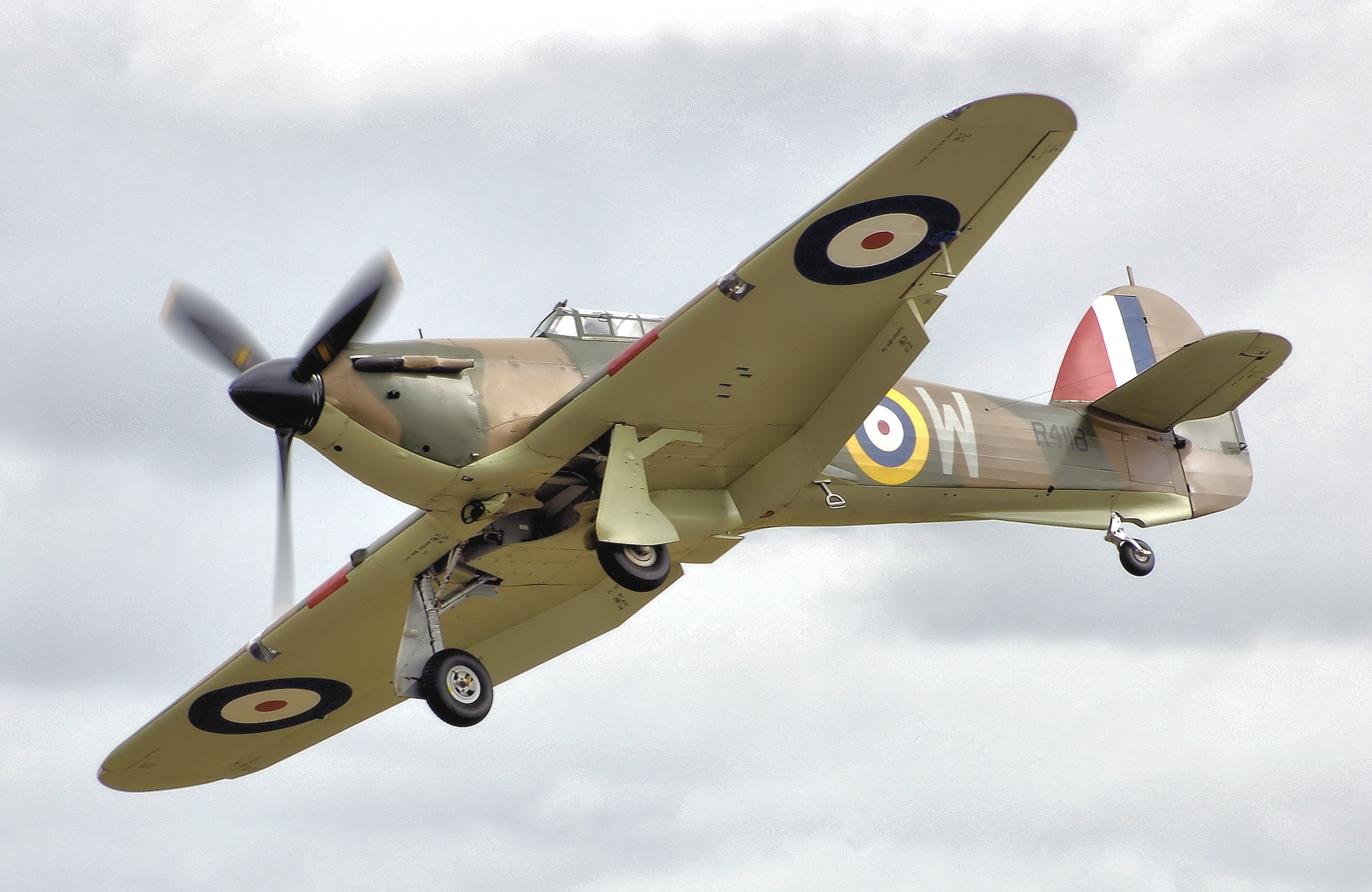
Hawker Hurricane, workhorse of the British defence in the Battle of Britain

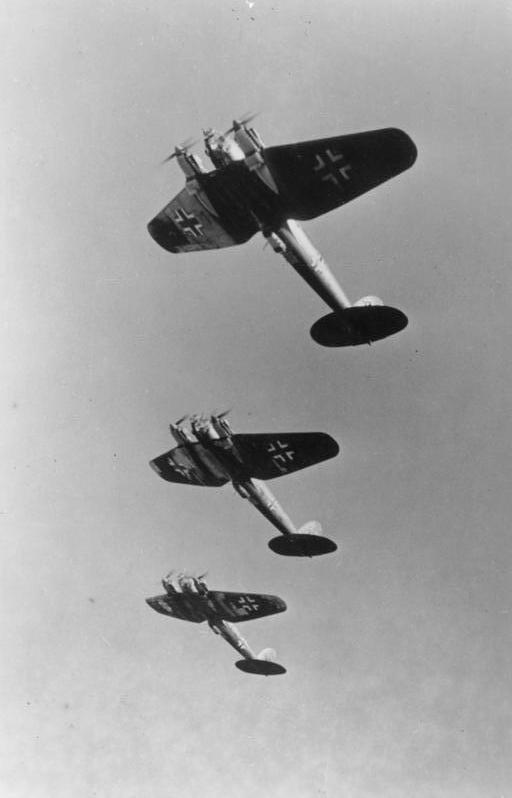
A formation of Heinkel He 111 medium bombers, the most numerous German bomber of the Battle of Britain

The Luftwaffe used 1,300 medium bombers guarded by 900 fighters; they made 1,500 sorties a day from bases in France, Belgium, and Norway. The Germans realized their Ju 87 Stukas and Heinkel He 111s were too vulnerable to modern British fighters. The RAF had 650 fighters, with more coming out of the factories every day. Three main fighter types were involved in the battle—the German Messerschmitt Bf 109E, and the British Hawker Hurricane and Supermarine Spitfire. The Hurricane accounted for most of the British kills throughout the battle because it made up the majority of the RAF fighter force—however, its kill-loss ratio was inferior to that of its counterpart the Spitfire. Of the three aircraft, the Hurricane was designed much earlier and was generally considered the least capable. Despite the high numbers of Hurricanes in the RAF at that time, the Spitfire became synonymous with the Battle of Britain and was somewhat of a symbol of resistance in the minds of the British public through the battle. The Bf 109E subtype's short combat radius of 330 km (205 mi) – due to limited fuel capacity as designed — prevented it from adequately "escorting" the Kampfgeschwader wings' medium bombers over England, limiting it to only some ten minutes of air combat over the UK before it had turn back for a safe return to northern France—this serious deficiency was not corrected until after the major air battles over England, through September 1940, had concluded.

The Royal Air Force also had at its disposal a complex and integrated network of reporting stations and operations control rooms incorporating the new innovation of radar. Known as the Dowding system (after Hugh Dowding, the commander of RAF Fighter Command during the battle and the man who ordered its implementation), it was the first integrated air defence system in the world, and is often credited with giving the RAF the ability to effectively counter German raids without the need for regular patrols by fighter aircraft, increasing the efficiency with which the RAF fighter force could operate. As such, the Dowding system is also often credited with a significant role in the overall outcome of the battle, and comparisons with the air warfare that occurred over France in the spring and early summer of 1940, in which there was no such system and in which the allied air forces were comprehensively defeated, seem to support this.

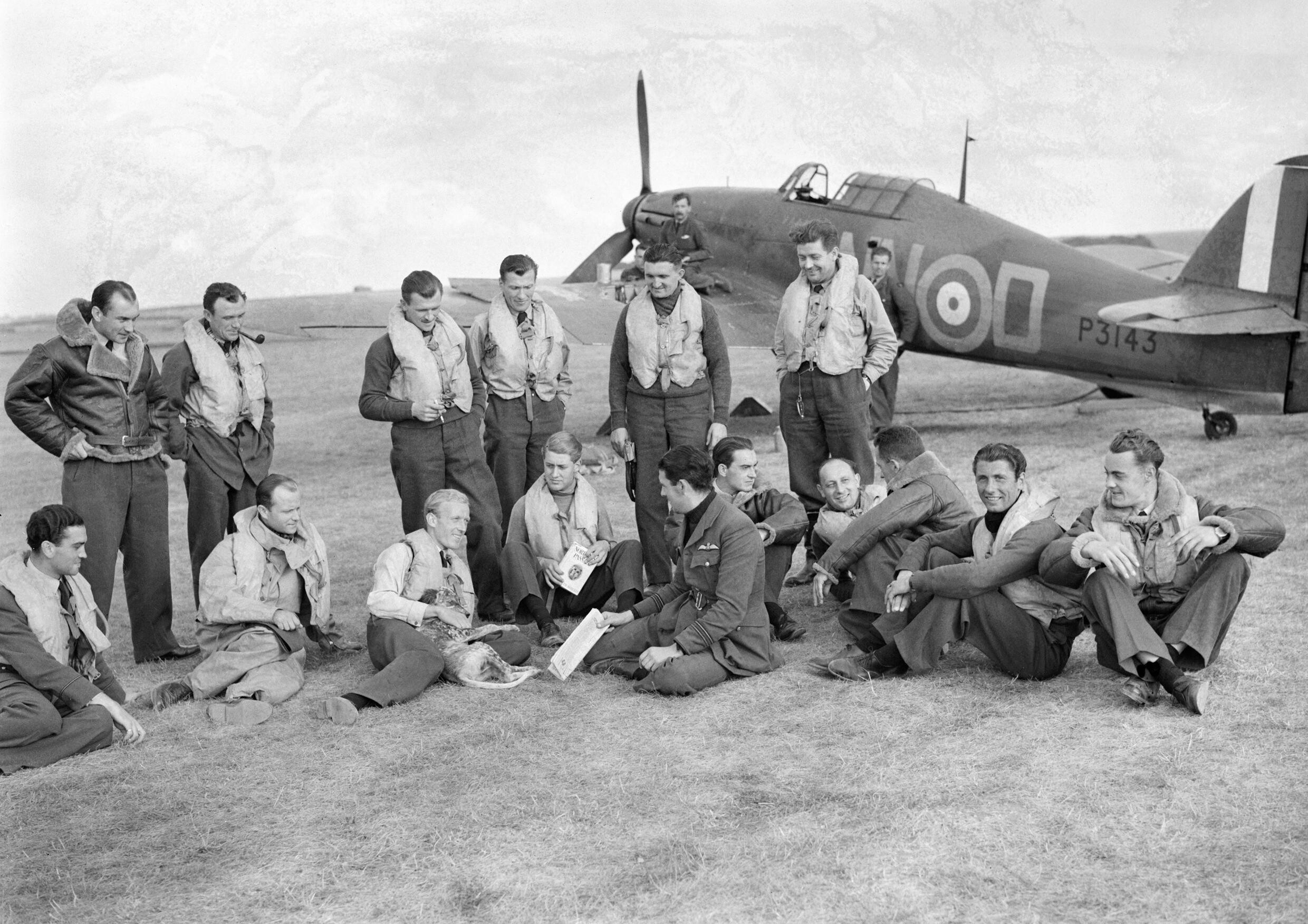
Czechoslovak fighter pilots of No. 310 Squadron RAF at RAF Duxford in 1940

At first the Germans focused on RAF airfields and radar stations. However, when the RAF bomber forces (quite separate from the fighter forces) attacked Berlin, Hitler swore revenge and diverted the Luftwaffe to attacks on London. Using limited resources to attack civilians instead of airfields and radar proved a major mistake as the civilians being hit were far less critical than the airfields and radar stations that were now ignored. London was not a factory city and British aircraft production was not impeded; indeed it went up. The last German daylight raid came on 30 September; the Luftwaffe realized it was taking unacceptable losses and broke off the attack; occasional blitz raids hit London and other cities from time. In all some 43,000 civilians were killed. The Luftwaffe lost 1,411 planes shot down of a grand total of 2,069 which were written off, the British lost about the same number, but could repair 289 of them. The British additionally lost 497 aircraft of Bomber and RAF Coastal Command shot down during that same period and hundreds of planes destroyed on the ground, lost by accidents or also written off. The successful British defense resulted from a better system that provided more concentration, better utilization of radar, and better ground control.

=== Invasion of the Soviet Union ===
Operation Barbarossa opened in June 1941, with striking initial German successes. In the air, many of the Soviets' aircraft were inferior, while the disparity in pilot quality may have been even greater. The purges of military leadership during the Great Terror heavily impacted command and control in all services.

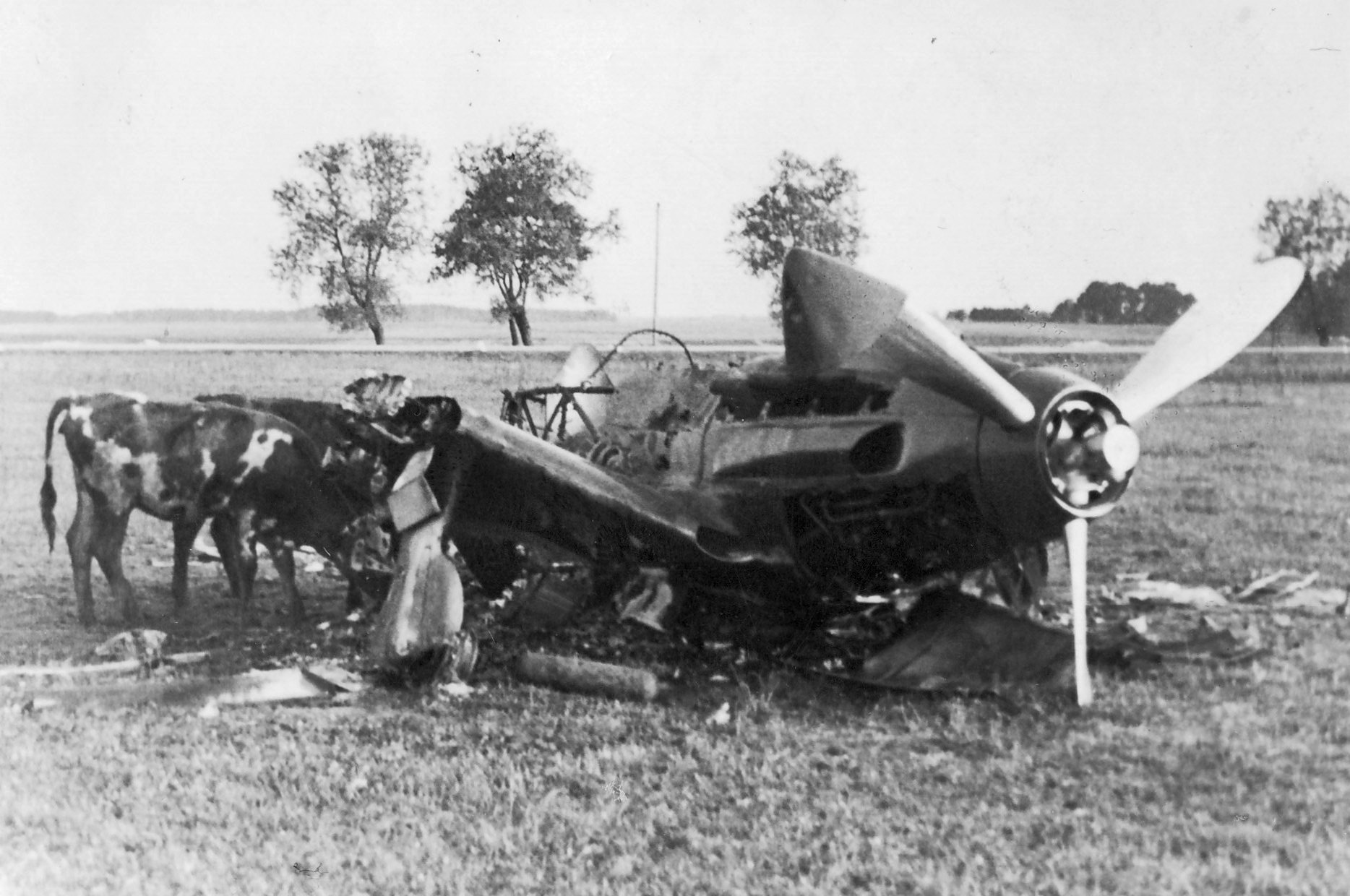
A destroyed Soviet MiG 3, 1941.

At the outbreak of the war, Soviet Air Forces had just been purged of most of its top officers and was unready. By 1945 Soviet annual aircraft production outstripped that of the German Reich; 157,000 aircraft were produced.

In the first few days of Operation Barbarossa in June 1941, the Luftwaffe destroyed 2,000 Soviet aircraft, most of them on the ground, at a loss of only 35 aircraft. The main weakness accounting for the heavy aircraft losses in 1941 was the lack of experienced generals, pilots, and ground support crews, the destruction of many aircraft on the runways due to command failure to disperse them, and the rapid advance of the Wehrmacht ground troops, forcing the Soviet pilots on the defensive during Operation Barbarossa, while being confronted with more modern German aircraft.

The Soviets relied heavily on Ilyushin Il-2 Shturmovik ground assault aircraft—the single most-produced military aircraft design of all time with some 36,183 examples produced, and the Yakovlev Yak-1 fighter, the beginning of a family of fighters from Alexander S. Yakovlev's design bureau in its many variants during the war years with just over 34,500 Yak-1, Yak-3, Yak-7, and Yak-9 aircraft produced in total; each of which became the most produced aircraft series of all time in their respective classes, together accounting for about half the strength of the VVS for most of the Great Patriotic War. The Yak-1 was a modern 1940 design and had more room for development, unlike the relatively mature design of the Messerschmitt Bf 109, itself dating from 1935. The Yak-9 brought the VVS to parity with the Luftwaffe, eventually allowing it to gain the upper hand over the Luftwaffe until in 1944, when many Luftwaffe pilots were deliberately avoiding combat.

Chief Marshal of Aviation Alexander Novikov led the VVS from 1942 to the end of the war, and was credited with introducing several new innovations and weapons systems. For the last year of the war German military and civilians retreating towards Berlin were hounded by constant strafing and light bombing. In one strategic operation, the Yassy-Kishinev Strategic Offensive, the 5th and 17th Air Armies and the Black Sea Fleet Naval Aviation aircraft achieved a 3.3:1 superiority in aircraft over the Luftflotte 4 and the Royal Romanian Air Force, allowing almost complete freedom from air harassment for the ground troops of the 2nd and 3rd Ukrainian Fronts.

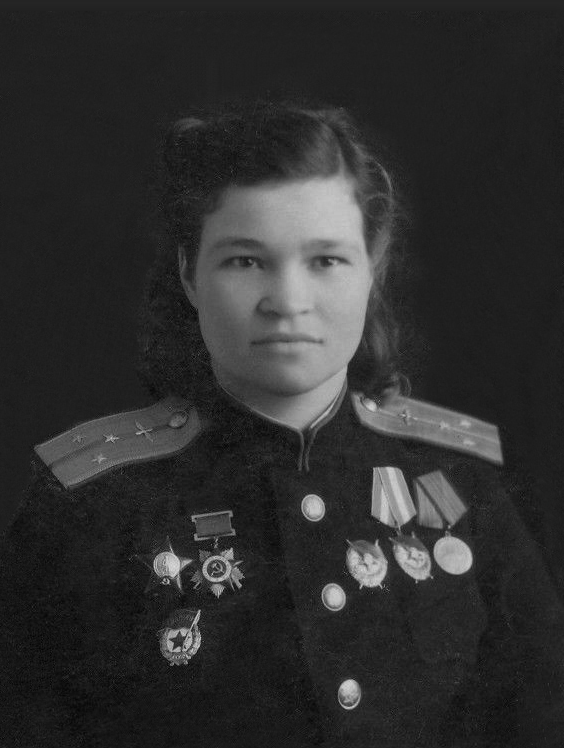
Irina Sebrova, a flight commander in the women's 46th Taman Guards Night Bomber Aviation Regiment, also known as the Night Witches, flew 1,008 sorties in the war, more than any other member of the regiment.

As with many Allied countries in World War II, the Soviet Union received Western aircraft through Lend-Lease, mostly Bell P-39 Airacobras, Bell P-63 Kingcobras, Curtiss P-40 Kittyhawks, Douglas A-20 Havocs, Hawker Hurricanes, and North American B-25 Mitchells. Some of these aircraft arrived in the Soviet Union in time to participate in the Battle of Moscow, and in particular with the PVO or Soviet Air Defence Forces. Soviet fliers in P-39s scored the highest individual kill totals of any ever to fly a U.S. aircraft. Two air regiments were equipped with Spitfire Mk.Vbs in early 1943 but immediately experienced unrelenting losses due to friendly fire as the British aircraft looked too much like the German Bf 109. The Soviet Union was then supplied with some 1,200 Spitfire Mk. IXs from 1943. Soviet pilots liked them but they did not suit Soviet combat tactics and the rough conditions at the forward airfields close to the front lines. Spitfires Mk. IXs were therefore assigned to air defense units, using the high altitude performance to intercept and pursue German bombers and reconnaissance aircraft. By 1944, the Spitfire IX was the main fighter used in this role and would remain so until 1947. Lend-Lease aircraft from the U.S. and UK accounted for nearly 12% of total Soviet air power.

The Luftwaffe operated from bases in Norway against the convoys to the Soviet Union. Long-range reconnaissance aircraft, circling the convoys out of their anti-aircraft artillery range, guided in attack aircraft, submarines, and surface ships.

== North Africa 1942–43 ==
The Anglo-American invasion of Vichy French controlled north-west Africa was under command of General Dwight D. Eisenhower. in November 1942, at a time when the Luftwaffe was still strong. Air operations were split – one force under US control and the other under British control. One of Eisenhower's corps commanders, General Lloyd Fredendall, used his planes as a "combat air patrol" that circled endlessly over his front lines ready to defend against Luftwaffe attackers. Like most infantrymen, Fredendall assumed that all assets should be used to assist the ground forces. More concerned with defence than attack, Fredendall was soon replaced by George Patton.

Likewise, the Luftwaffe made the mistake of dividing up its air assets, and failed to gain control of the air or to cut Allied supplies. The RAF in North Africa, under Air Marshal Arthur Tedder, concentrated its air power and defeated the Luftwaffe. The RAF had an excellent training program (using bases in Canada), maintained very high aircrew morale, and inculcated a fighting spirit. Senior officers monitored battles by radar, and directed planes by radio to where they were most needed.

The RAF's success convinced Eisenhower that its system maximized the effectiveness of tactical air power. The point was that air power had to be consolidated at the highest level, and had to operate almost autonomously. Brigade, division, and corps commanders lost control of air assets (except for a few unarmed little "grasshoppers;" observation aircraft that reported the fall of artillery shells so the gunners could correct their aim). With one airman in overall charge, air assets could be concentrated for maximum offensive capability, not frittered away in ineffective "penny packets". Eisenhower—a tanker in 1918 who had theorized on the best way to concentrate armor—recognized the analogy. Split up among infantry in supporting roles tanks were wasted; concentrated in a powerful force they could dictate the terms of battle.

The fundamental assumption of air power doctrine was that the air war was just as important as the ground war. Indeed, the main function of the sea and ground forces, insisted the air enthusiasts, was to seize forward air bases. Field Manual 100–20, issued in July 1943, became the airman's bible for the rest of the war, and taught the doctrine of equality of air and land warfare. The idea of combined arms operations (air, land, sea) strongly appealed to Eisenhower and Douglas MacArthur. Eisenhower invaded only after he was certain of air supremacy, and he made the establishment of forward air bases his first priority. MacArthur's leaps reflected the same doctrine. In each theatre the senior ground command post had an attached air command post. Requests from the front lines went all the way to the top, where the air commander decided whether to act, when and how. This slowed down response time—it might take 48 hours to arrange a strike—and involved rejecting numerous requests from the infantry for help or intervention at times.

=== Operations against Allied convoys ===
German air reconnaissance against North Atlantic and Russian convoys increased, with CAM ships carrying a single fighter still the main defence. The Luftwaffe's first major attack on the convoys began on 25 April 1942 when the 34-ship convoy PQJ6 was attacked. PQ17 to Murmansk started with 36 ships; only two made it through when the Admiralty, falsely thinking Germany was attacking with a battleship, ordered the convoy, and its escort, to scatter. There was no battleship, but the Luftwaffe and a pack of German submarines sank one cruiser, one destroyer, two patrol boats (4,000 tons), and 22 merchant ships (139,216 tons). Nevertheless, most convoys did get through.

== 1943 ==
In some areas, such as the most intense part of the Battle of the Atlantic, the Germans enjoyed fleeting success. Grueling operations wasted the Luftwaffe away on the eastern front after 1942.

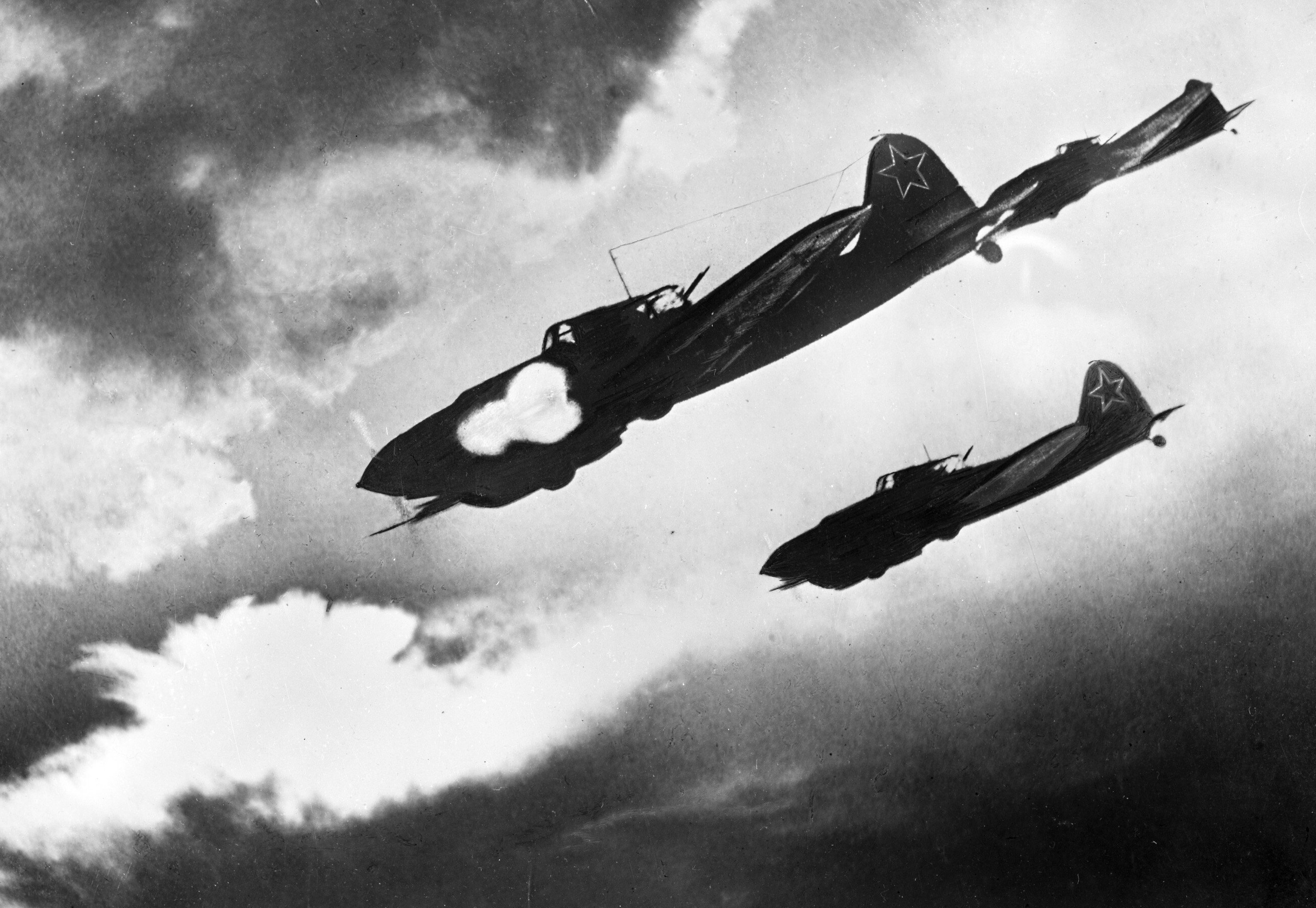
Soviet Il-2 ground-attack planes attack an enemy column, Voronezh Front, 1 July 1943

In early 1943 the Allied strategic bombers were directed against U-boat pens, which were easy to reach and which represented a major strategic threat to Allied logistics. However, the pens were very solidly built—it took 7,000 flying hours to destroy one sub there, about the same effort that it took to destroy one-third of Cologne.

Japan was also still recovering from Midway. It kept producing planes but made few innovations and the quality of its new pilots deteriorated steadily. Gasoline shortages limited the training and usage of the air forces.

=== British technical advances ===
Building on their lead in radar and their experience with the Battle of the Beams, RAF Bomber Command developed a variety of devices to enable precision strategic bombing. Gee and Oboe were beam-riding blind bombing aids, while H2S was the first airborne ground-scanning radar system – enabling improved navigation to a target and bombing at night and through cloud if necessary. These could be used in conjunction with Pathfinder bombers to guarantee accurate strikes on targets in all weathers.

The British also developed the techniques of Operational Research and Analysis, using mathematical techniques to examine military tactics and recommend best practice. These were used to optimise the impacts of night bombing raids, which were expanded to sizes in excess of 1000 bombers attacking one objective. Defensive technologies were invented, such as rear-facing airborne radar to detect night-fighters and the use of Window to blind German radar, giving the RAF striking capability far in excess of that which the Luftwaffe had been able to achieve.

The de Havilland Mosquito bomber was beginning to be delivered in late 1942, combining a useful bomb load with speed to evade German fighters, it was used to harass German air defences as well as challenging strikes such as that on a Gestapo headquarters or prisons as in Operation Jericho

The RAF also developed the use of "earthquake bombs" to attack huge structures thought to be invulnerable to conventional bombing. Creating the largest bomb used in the war and a specialist squadron to deliver it, a number of critical German infrastructure assets were destroyed, such as the Möhne and Edersee Dams.

The use of developments such as these contributed greatly to the success of the air bombing strategy during the remainder of the war.

=== Mediterranean theatre ===
In the Mediterranean, the Luftwaffe tried to stop the invasions of Sicily and Italy with tactical bombing. They failed because the Allied air forces systematically destroyed most of their air fields. The Germans ferociously opposed the Allied landing at Anzio in February 1944, but the Luftwaffe was outnumbered 5 to 1 and so outclassed in equipment and skill that it inflicted little damage. Italian air space belonged to the Allies, and the Luftwaffe's strategic capability was nil. The Luftwaffe threw everything it had against the Salerno beachhead, but was outgunned ten to one, and then lost the vital airfields at Foggia.

Foggia became the major base of the 15th Air Force. Its 2,000 heavy bombers hit Germany from the south while the 4,000 heavies of the 8th Air Force used bases in Britain, along with 1,300 RAF heavies. While bad weather in the north often cancelled raids, sunny Italian skies allowed for more action. After that the Luftwaffe had only one success in Italy, a raid on the American port at Bari, in December 1943. Only 30 out of 100 bombers got through, but one hit an ammunition ship which was secretly carrying a stock of mustard gas for retaliatory use should the Germans initiate the use of gas. Clouds of American mustard gas caused over 2,000 Allied and civilian casualties.

== 1944–45 ==
In early 1944, the Allies continued to bomb Germany, while carefully attacking targets in France that could interfere with the invasion, planned for June.

=== Destroying the Luftwaffe, 1944 ===
In late 1943, the AAF suddenly realized the need to revise its basic doctrine: strategic bombing against a technologically sophisticated enemy like Germany was impossible without air supremacy. General Arnold replaced Ira Eaker with Carl Spaatz and, most critically, Maj. Gen. Jimmy Doolittle, who fully appreciated the new reality. They provided fighter escorts all the way into Germany and back, and cleverly used B-17s as bait for Luftwaffe planes, which the escorts then shot down. Doolittle's slogan was "The First Duty of 8th AF Fighters is to Destroy German Fighters.", one aspect of modern "Offensive Counter-Air" (OCA). In one "Big Week" in February 1944, American bombers protected by hundreds of fighters, flew 3,800 sorties dropping 10,000 tons of high explosives on the main German aircraft and ball-bearing factories. The US suffered 2,600 casualties, with a loss of 137 bombers and 21 fighters. Ball bearing production was unaffected, as Nazi munitions boss Albert Speer repaired the damage in a few weeks; he even managed to double aircraft production. Sensing the danger, Speer began dispersing production into numerous small, hidden factories.

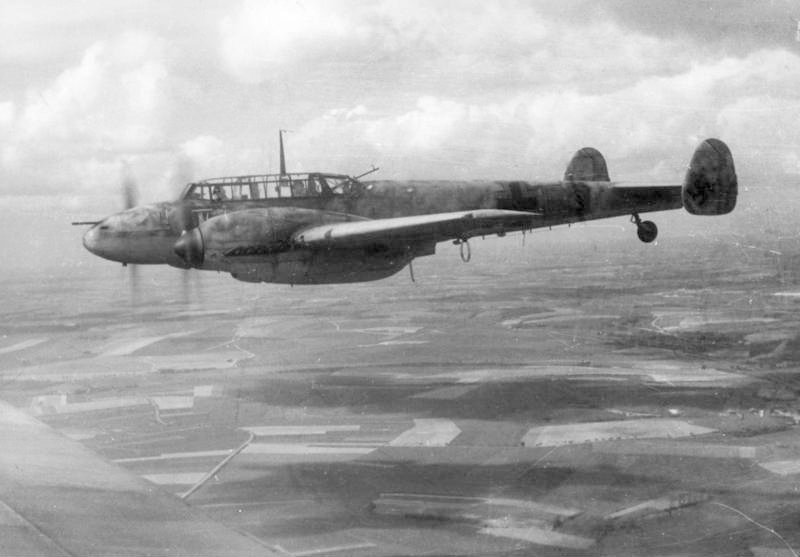
Bf 110 built to shoot down heavy Allied bombers by day, but mostly achieved success as a repurposed night fighter with Lichtenstein radar fitted.

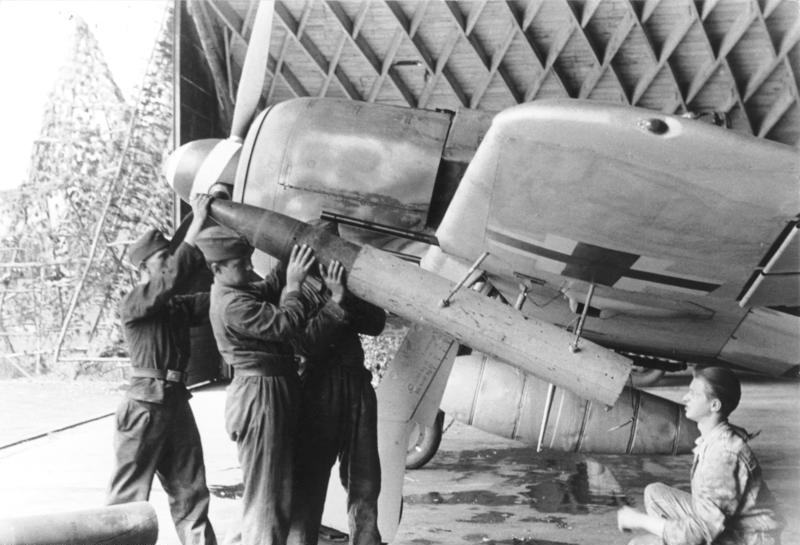
An Fw 190A arming-up with a BR 21 unguided rocket projectile

By 1944, the Allies had overwhelming advantages. The Luftwaffe would have to come out and attack or see its planes destroyed at the factory. Before getting at the bombers, ideally with the twin-engined Zerstörer heavy fighters meant for such tasks, the Germans had to confront the more numerous American fighters. The heavily armed Messerschmitt Bf 110 could kill a bomber, particularly those armed with a quartet each of the BR 21 large-calibre air-to-air unguided rockets, but its slower speed made it easy prey for Thunderbolts and Mustangs. The big, slow twin-engine Junkers Ju 88C, used for bomber destroyer duties in 1942–3 as the American heavy bomber offensive got under way in August 1942, was dangerous because it could stand further off and fire its autocannon armament into the tight B-17 formations, sometimes with the specialized Ju 88P heavy-calibre Bordkanone armed bomber destroyers attacking; but they too were hunted down. The same fate also faced single-engined fighters carrying pairs of the BR 21 rockets each; and the later-used, heavily autocannon-armed Sturmbock bomber destroyer models of the Focke-Wulf Fw 190A-8 that replaced the twin-engined "destroyers". Germany's severe shortage of aviation fuel had sharply curtailed the training of new pilots, and most of the instructors had been themselves sent into battle. Rookie pilots were rushed into combat after only 160 flying hours in training compared to 400 hours for the AAF, 360 for the RAF, and 120 for the Japanese. The low quality German pilots of this late stage in the war never had a chance against more numerous, better trained Allied pilots.

The Germans began losing one thousand planes a month on the western front (and another 400 on the eastern front). Realizing that the best way to defeat the Luftwaffe was not to stick close to the bombers but to aggressively seek out the enemy, by March 1944 Doolittle had ordered the Mustangs to "go hunting for Jerries. Flush them out in the air and beat them up on the ground on the way home.", as Mustangs were now ordered to fly in massive "fighter sweeps" well ahead of the American combat box heavy bomber formations, as a determined form of air supremacy effort, clearing the skies well ahead of the bombers of any presence of the Luftwaffe's Jagdflieger fighter pilots. By early 1944, with the Zerstörergeschwader-flown heavy Bf 110G and Me 410A Hornisse twin-engined fighters being decimated by the Mustangs whenever they appeared, direct attack against the bombers was carried out instead by the Luftwaffe's so-named Gefechtsverband formations with heavily armed Fw 190As being escorted by Bf 109Gs as high-altitude escorts for the autocannon-armed 190As when flying against the USAAF's combat box formations. However, Doolittle's new air supremacy strategy fatally disabled virtually any and all of the Luftwaffe's defensive efforts throughout 1944. On one occasion German air controllers identified a large force of approaching B-17s, and sent all the Luftwaffe's 750 fighters to attack. The bogeys were all Mustangs flying well ahead of the American bombers' combat boxes, which shot down 98 interceptors while losing 11. The actual B-17s were well behind the Mustangs, and completed their mission without a loss. In February 1944, the Luftwaffe lost 33% of its frontline fighters and 18% of its pilots; the next month it lost 56% of its fighters and 22% of the pilots. April was just as bad, 43% and 20%, and May was worst of all, at 50% and 25%. German factories continued to produce many new planes, and inexperienced new pilots did report for duty; but their life expectancy was down to a few combat sorties. Increasingly the Luftwaffe went into hiding; with losses down to 1% per mission, the bombers now got through.

By April 1944, Luftwaffe tactical air power had vanished, and Eisenhower decided he could go ahead with the invasion of Normandy. He guaranteed the invaders that "if you see fighting aircraft over you, they will be ours."

For the last year of the war German military and civilians retreating towards Berlin were hounded by the presence of Soviet "low flying aircraft" strafing and bombing them, an activity in which even the ancient Polikarpov Po-2, a much produced flight training (uchebnyy) biplane of 1920s design, took part. However, this was but a small measure of the experience the Wehrmacht were receiving due to the sophistication and superiority of the Red Air Force. In one strategic operation alone, the Yassy-Kishinev Strategic Offensive, the 5th and 17th Air Armys and the Black Sea Fleet Naval Aviation aircraft achieved a 3.3 to 1 superiority in aircraft over Luftflotte 4 and the Royal Romanian Air Force, allowing almost complete freedom from air harassment for the ground troops of the 2nd and 3rd Ukrainian Fronts. The greatest Soviet fighter ace of World War II was Ivan Nikitovich Kozhedub, who scored 62 victories from 6 July 1943 to 16 April 1945, the top score for any Allied fighter pilot of World War II.

=== Normandy ===
As the Luftwaffe disintegrated in 1944, escorting became less necessary and fighters were increasingly assigned to tactical ground-attack missions, along with the medium bombers. To avoid the lethal fast-firing German quadruple 20 mm flak guns, pilots came in fast and low (under enemy radar), made a quick run, then disappeared before the gunners could respond. The main missions were to keep the Luftwaffe suppressed by shooting up airstrips, and to interdict the movement of munitions, oil, and troops by attacking at railway bridges and tunnels, oil tank farms, canal barges, trucks, and moving trains. Occasionally a choice target was discovered through intelligence. Three days after D-Day, Ultra intelligence pinpointed the location of Panzer Group West headquarters. A quick raid by British aircraft destroyed its radio gear and killed many key officers, ruining the Germans' ability to coordinate a panzer counterattack against the beachheads.

On D-Day itself, Allied aircraft flew 14,000 sorties, while the Luftwaffe managed a mere 260, mostly in defence of its own battered airfields. In the two weeks after D-Day, the Luftwaffe lost 600 of the 800 planes it kept in France. From April through August 1944, both the AAF's and the RAF's strategic bombers were placed under Eisenhower's direction, where they were used tactically to support the invasion. Airmen protested vigorously against this subordination of the air war to the land campaign, but Eisenhower forced the issue and used the bombers to simultaneously strangle Germany's supply system, burn out its oil refineries, and destroy its warplanes. With this accomplished, Eisenhower relinquished control of the bombers in September.

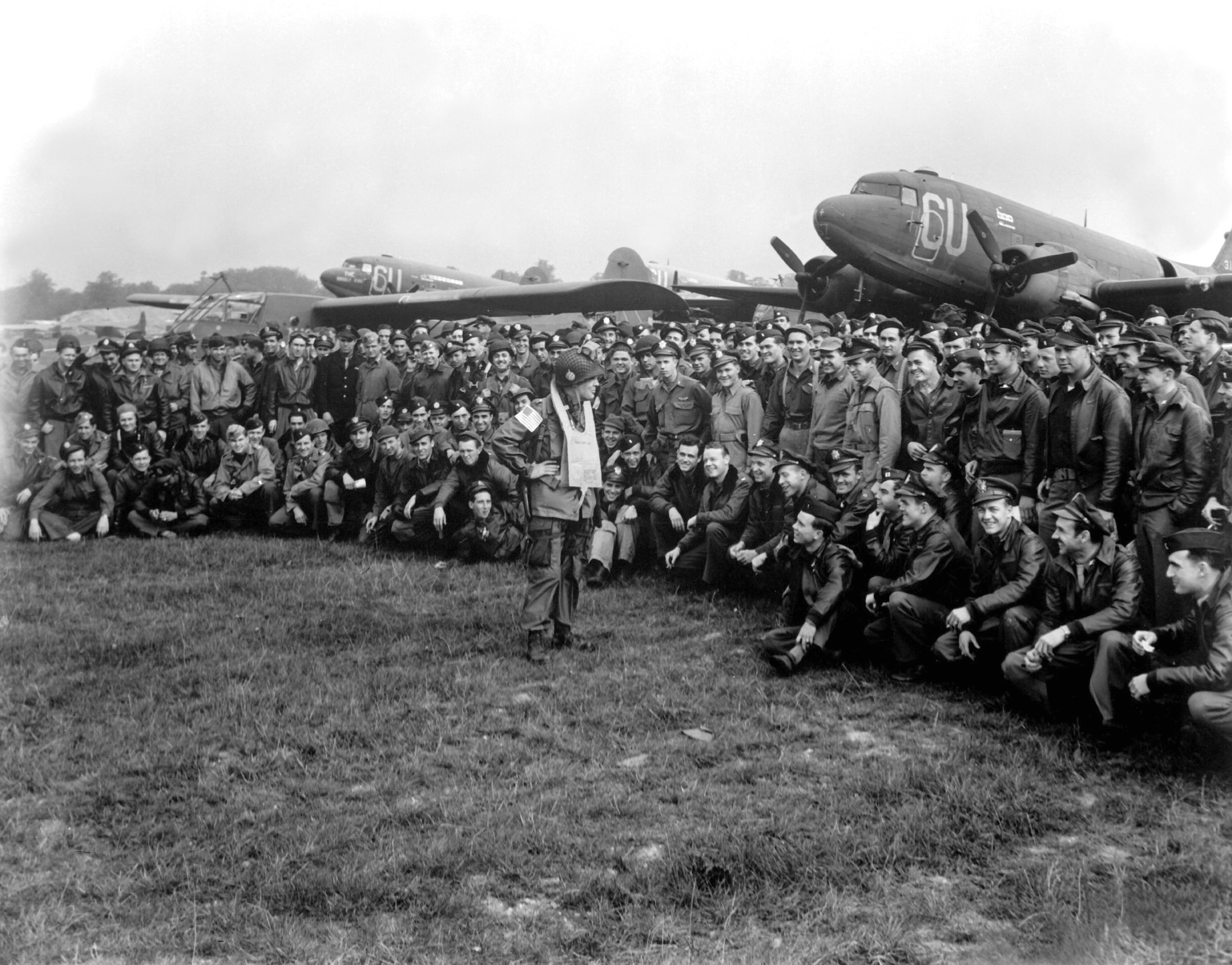
Brig. Gen. Anthony McAuliffe gives last-minute instructions to glider pilots before Operation Market Garden, 18 September 1944

In Europe in summer 1944 the AAF started operating out of bases in France. It had about 1,300 light bomber crews and 4,500 fighter pilots. They claimed destruction of 86,000 railroad cars, 9,000 locomotives, 68,000 trucks, and 6,000 tanks and armored artillery pieces. P-47 Thunderbolts alone dropped 120,000 tons of bombs and thousands of tanks of napalm, fired 135 million bullets and 60,000 rockets, and claimed 4,000 enemy planes destroyed. Beyond the destruction itself, the appearance of unopposed Allied fighter-bombers ruined morale, as privates and generals alike dove for the ditches. Field Marshal Erwin Rommel, for example, was seriously wounded in July 1944, when he dared to ride around France in the daytime. The commander of the elite 2nd Panzer Division fulminated:

"They have complete mastery of the air. They bomb and strafe every movement, even single vehicles and individuals. They reconnoiter our area constantly and direct their artillery fire ... The feeling of helplessness against enemy aircraft has a paralyzing effect, and during the bombing barrage the effect on inexperienced troops is literally 'soul-shattering.'"

=== Battle of the Bulge ===
At the Battle of the Bulge in December 1944, the Allies were caught by surprise by a large scale German offensive. In the first days bad weather grounded all planes. When the skies cleared, 52,000 AAF and 12,000 RAF sorties against German positions and supply lines immediately doomed Hitler's last offensive. General George Patton said the cooperation of XIX TAC Air Force was "the best example of the combined use of air and ground troops that I ever witnessed."

=== Strategic operations ===
An around-the-clock campaign attacked Germany, with British bombers at night and U.S. aircraft during the day. The aircraft, tactics, and doctrines were different; there is argument over how complementary they were in achieving strategic effect.

The Luftwaffe reached a maximum size of 1.9 million airmen in 1942. Grueling operations wasted it away on the Eastern Front after 1942. It lost most of its fighter aircraft to Mustangs in 1944 while trying to defend against massive American and British air raids, and many of the men were sent to the infantry. The Luftwaffe in 1944–45 concentrated on anti-aircraft defences, especially the flak batteries that surrounded all major German cities and war plants. They consumed a large fraction of all German munitions production in the last year of the war. The flak units employed hundreds of thousands of women, who engaged in combat against the Allied bombers.

The jet-powered German Messerschmitt Me 262 Schwalbe far outclassed the best allied piston engined fighters on an individual basis. (Note: The British and American jets were in the development stage when the war ended.) However, its protracted development history (including such factors as, a substantial cutback in funding jet engine research during the critical 1941–42 development period, Germany's lack of access to certain exotic raw materials necessary to produce durable jet engines, allied strategic bombing of jet engine production lines, and Hitler personally ordering design modifications to make the aircraft functional as a fighter-bomber) ensured that the Me 262 was delayed and produced too late and in too small numbers to stem the Allied tide. The Germans also developed air-to-surface missiles (Fritz X, Hs 293,) surface-to-air missiles (Wasserfall,) cruise missiles (V-1) and ballistic missiles (V-2,) and other advanced technologies of air warfare, to little strategic effect. Captured examples of these weapons, and especially of their designers, contributed to Allied and Soviet military technologies of the Cold War, and also of the space race.

=== Destroying Germany's oil and transportation ===
Besides knocking out the Luftwaffe, the second most striking achievement of the strategic bombing campaign was the destruction of the German oil supply. Oil was essential for U-boats and tanks, while very high-quality aviation gasoline was essential for piston-engined aircraft. (Note: Jet engines ran on cheap kerosene, and rockets used plain alcohol; the railroad system used coal, which was in abundant supply.)

The third notable achievement of the bombing campaign was the degradation of the German transportation system—its railroads and canals (there was little road traffic). In the two months before and after D-Day, American B-24 Liberators, B-17 Flying Fortresses, and British heavy bombers such as the Lancasters hammered away at the French railroad system. Underground Resistance fighters sabotaged some 350 locomotives and 15,000 freight cars every month. Critical bridges and tunnels were cut by bombing or sabotage. Berlin responded by sending in 60,000 German railway workers, but even they took two or three days to reopen a line after heavy raids on switching yards. The system deteriorated quickly, and it proved incapable of carrying reinforcements and supplies to oppose the Normandy invasion.

=== Effect of the strategic bombing ===
US Air Force photographs the destruction in central Berlin in July 1945

Germany and Japan were burned out and lost the war in large part because of strategic bombing. Targeting became more accurate in 1944, but the solution to inaccurate bombs was using more of them. The AAF dropped 3.5 million bombs (500,000 tons) against Japan, and 8 million (1.6 million tons) against Germany. The RAF expended about the same tonnage against Germany. US Navy and Marine bombs against Japan are not included, nor are the two atomic bombs.

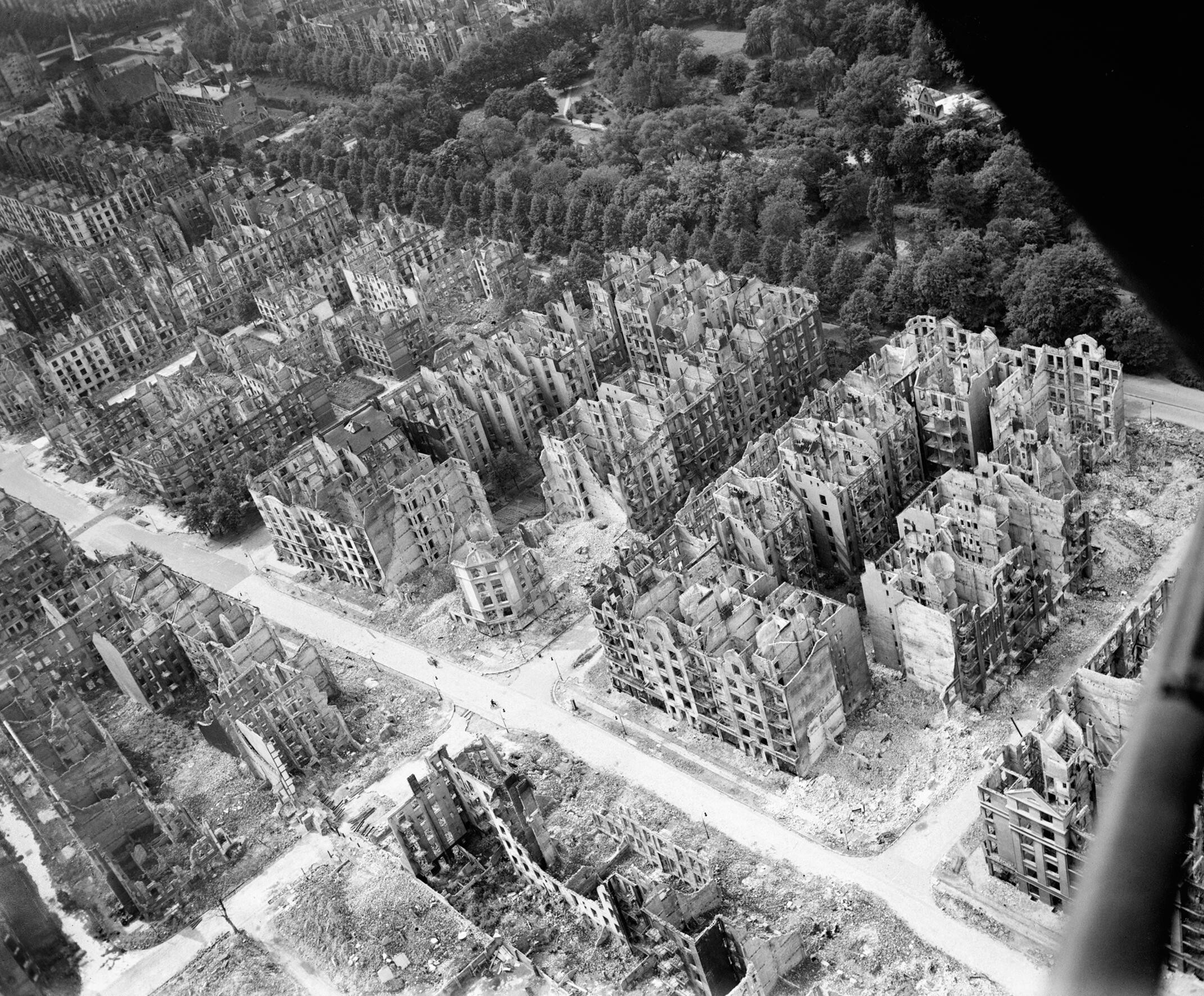
Typical bomb damage in Hamburg, Germany 1945

The cost of the US tactical and strategic air war against Germany was 18,400 aircraft lost in combat, 51,000 dead, 30,000 POWs, and 13,000 wounded. Against Japan, the AAF lost 4,500 planes, 16,000 dead, 6,000 POWs, and 5,000 wounded; Marine Aviation lost 1,600 killed, 1,100 wounded. Naval aviation lost several thousand dead.

One fourth of the German war economy was neutralized because of direct bomb damage, the resulting delays, shortages, and roundabout solutions, and the spending on anti-aircraft, civil defence, repair, and removal of factories to safer locations. The raids were so large and often repeated that in city after city, the repair system broke down. The bombing prevented the full mobilization of German economic potential. Planning minister Albert Speer and his staff were effective in improvising solutions and work-arounds, but their challenge became more difficult every week as one backup system after another broke down. By March 1945, most of Germany's factories, railroads, and telephones had stopped working; troops, tanks, trains, and trucks were immobilized. About 25,000 civilians died in Dresden on 13–14 February, where a firestorm erupted. Overy estimated in 2014 that in all about 353,000 civilians were killed by British and American bombing of German cities.

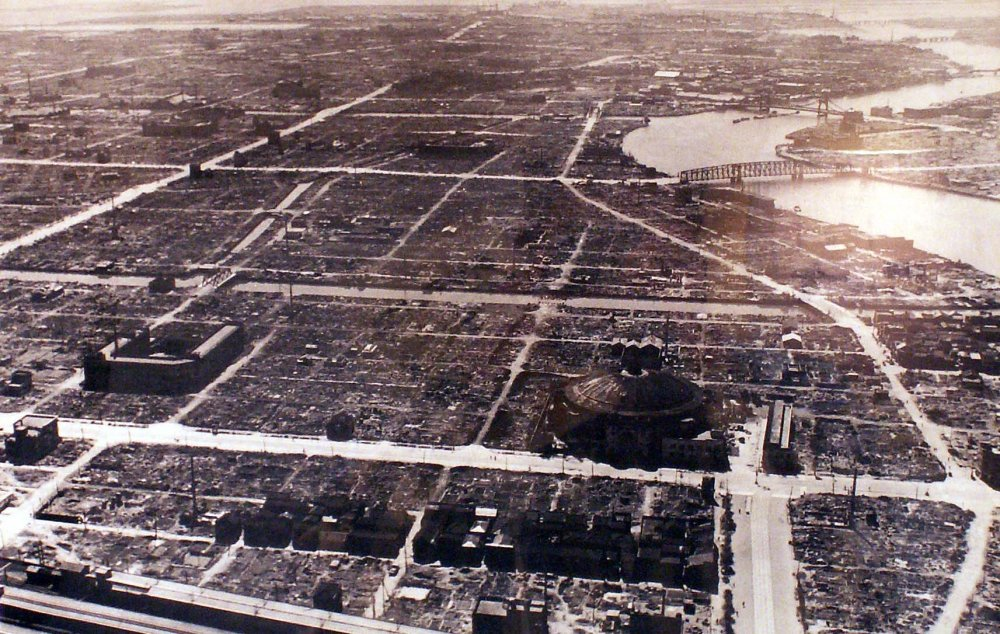
Results of the Meetinghouse raid on Tokyo

Joseph Goebbels, Hitler's propaganda minister, was disconsolate when his beautiful ministry buildings were totally burned out: "The air war has now turned into a crazy orgy. We are totally defenceless against it. The Reich will gradually be turned into a complete desert."

The Dresden raid was to be dwarfed by what was to hit Japan starting less than a month later—as initiated by General Curtis E. LeMay, a series of firebombing raids, launched with the first attack by some 334 American B-29 Superfortress heavy bombers on the night of 9–10 March 1945, codenamed Operation Meetinghouse, burned out some 16 square miles (41 km^{2}.) of the capital city of Japan and turned out to be the single most destructive bombing raid in all of aviation history, even greater in initial loss of life (at 100,000 lives lost at minimum, and up to 1.5 million people homeless) than the 6 & 9 August atomic raids, each taken as single events.

== See also ==
- Aviation in World War II
- List of air operations during the Battle of Europe
- Battle of Britain
- Battle of the Atlantic
- Military production during World War II
- Strategic bombing during World War II
- Victory Through Air Power
