= Office for Emergency Management =

US federal executive office, 1940–1944

Agency overview
- Formed: May 25, 1940
- Preceding agency: similar earlier agencies: Council of National Defense (WWI)
- Dissolved: November 30, 1944
- Superseding agencies: liquidated to: Procurement Division at Treasury, CSC, OWI, Public Buildings Administration; similar later agencies: Economic Stabilization Agency (Korean War); Office of Emergency Preparedness; FEMA (current day)
- Jurisdiction: United States Government
- Headquarters: Washington, D.C.
- Parent agency: Executive Office of the President
- Child agencies: Office of Price Administration; Office of Economic Stabilization; Office of Production Management, War Manpower Commission, War Shipping Administration, War Relocation Authority, Office of Defense Transportation, Office of Facts and Figures, Office of Scientific Research and Development; Supply Priorities and Allocations Board, Office of Alien Property Management, Foreign Economic Administration; War Production Board, Office of Civilian Defense, Office of Temporary Controls, Committee on Fair Employment Practice; Office of Economic Warfare, Office of War Mobilization, Office of War Information

The Office for Emergency Management (OEM) was a division under the executive office of the President of the United States which existed from 1940 until it was dissolved in 1944. It was established by administrative order issued on May 25, 1940, in accordance with executive order 8248 issued on September 8, 1939.

The office functioned to assist the president in clearing information on defense measures. It maintained liaison with national defense agencies and coordinated the national defense program.

The office was abolished progressively, with the Division of Information terminated by EO 9182, June 13, 1942; liaison functions terminated with resignation of liaison officer for emergency management (the OEM director), November 3, 1943; and Division of Central Administrative Affairs abolished, effective November 30, 1944, by EO 9471, August 25, 1944, with the Department of the Treasury named as liquidator.

== Successor agencies ==
- United States Civil Service Commission
- United States Office of War Information (nonspecific functions of OEM's Division of Information)
- Procurement Division of the United States Department of the Treasury
- Public Buildings Administration (nonspecific functions of OEM's Division of Central Administrative Services)
- Agency-specific functions of OEM-coordinated agencies reverted to those agencies.

== See also ==
- Wayne Coy, OEM liaison officer
