= Henry A. Wallace =

Vice President of the United States from 1941 to 1945

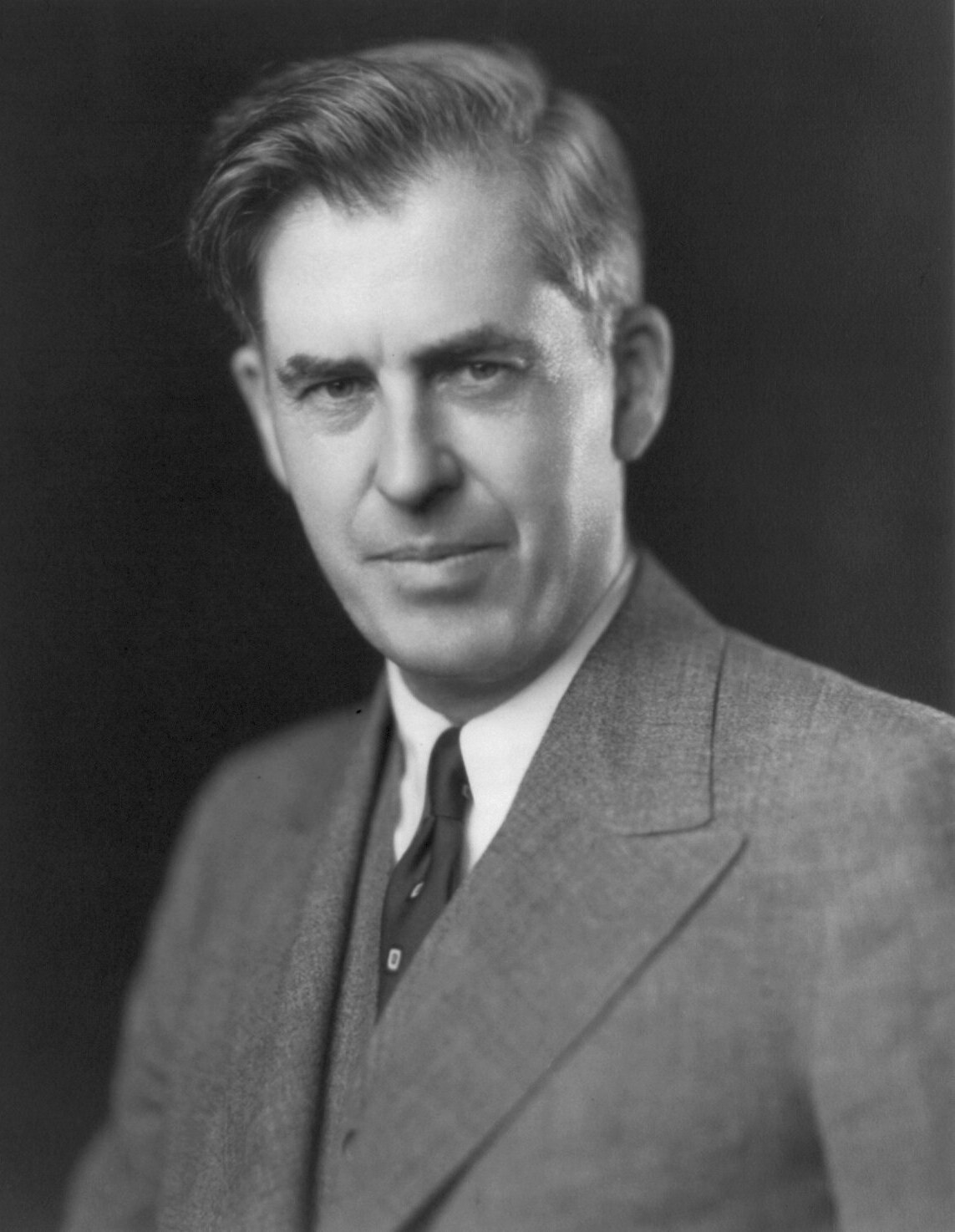
- Official portrait, 1940

33rd Vice President of the United States
- In office January 20, 1941 – January 20, 1945
- President: Franklin D. Roosevelt
- Preceded by: John Nance Garner
- Succeeded by: Harry S. Truman

10th United States Secretary of Commerce
- In office March 2, 1945 – September 20, 1946
- President: Franklin D. Roosevelt; Harry S. Truman
- Preceded by: Jesse H. Jones
- Succeeded by: W. Averell Harriman

Chair of the Supply Priorities and Allocations Board
- In office August 28, 1941 – January 16, 1942
- President: Franklin D. Roosevelt
- Preceded by: Office established
- Succeeded by: Office abolished

Chair of the Board of Economic Warfare
- In office July 2, 1940 – July 15, 1943
- President: Franklin D. Roosevelt
- Preceded by: Office established
- Succeeded by: Office abolished

11th United States Secretary of Agriculture
- In office March 4, 1933 – September 4, 1940
- President: Franklin D. Roosevelt
- Preceded by: Arthur M. Hyde
- Succeeded by: Claude R. Wickard

Personal details
- Born: Henry Agard Wallace; October 7, 1888 Orient, Iowa, U.S.
- Died: November 18, 1965 (aged 77) Danbury, Connecticut, U.S.
- Resting place: Glendale Cemetery, Des Moines, Iowa, U.S.
- Party: Republican (1909–1936); Democratic (1936–1947, 1964–1965); Progressive (1948–1950)
- Other political affiliations: Bull Moose Party (1912)
- Spouse: Ilo Browne (m. 1914)
- Children: 3
- Parent: Henry Cantwell Wallace (father)
- Education: Iowa State University (BS)
- Occupation: Politician; journalist; farmer; businessman
- Henry A. Wallace's voice Portion of Wallace's "What Are We Fighting For" speech on the difference between the Axis and the Allies of World War II; Recorded May 8, 1942

Henry Agard Wallace (October 7, 1888 – November 18, 1965) was the 33rd vice president of the United States, serving from 1941 to 1945, under President Franklin D. Roosevelt. He served as the 11th U.S. secretary of agriculture and the 10th U.S. secretary of commerce. He was the nominee of the new Progressive Party in the 1948 presidential election.

The oldest son of Henry Cantwell Wallace, who served as U.S. secretary of agriculture from 1921 to 1924, Wallace was born in rural Iowa. After graduating from Iowa State University in 1910, he worked as a writer and editor for his family's farm journal, Wallaces' Farmer. He also founded the Hi-Bred Corn Company, a hybrid corn company that became extremely successful. Wallace displayed intellectual curiosity about a wide array of subjects, including statistics and economics, and explored various religious and spiritual movements, including Theosophy. After his father's death in 1924, Wallace drifted away from the Republican Party; he supported Democratic nominee Franklin D. Roosevelt in the 1932 presidential election.

Wallace served as Secretary of Agriculture under Roosevelt from 1933 to 1940. He strongly supported the New Deal and presided over a major shift in federal agricultural policy, implementing measures designed to curtail agricultural surpluses and to ameliorate rural poverty. Roosevelt overcame strong opposition from conservative leaders in the Democratic Party and had Wallace nominated for vice president at the 1940 Democratic National Convention. The Roosevelt–Wallace ticket won the 1940 presidential election. At the 1944 Democratic National Convention, conservative party leaders defeated Wallace's bid for renomination, placing Missouri Senator Harry S. Truman on the Democratic ticket instead. In early 1945, Roosevelt appointed Wallace as Secretary of Commerce.

Roosevelt died in April 1945 and Truman succeeded him as president. Wallace continued to serve as Secretary of Commerce until September 1946, when he was fired by Truman for delivering a speech urging conciliatory policies toward the Soviet Union. Wallace and his supporters then established the nationwide Progressive Party and launched a third-party campaign for president. The Progressive platform called for conciliatory policies toward the USSR, desegregation of public schools, racial and gender equality, a national health-insurance program, and other left-wing policies. Accusations of communist influence followed, and Wallace's association with controversial Theosophist figure Nicholas Roerich undermined his campaign; he received 2.4% of the popular vote. Wallace broke with the Progressive Party in 1950 over the Korean War, and in a 1952 article he called the Soviet Union "utterly evil". Turning his attention back to agricultural innovation, he became a highly successful businessman. He specialized in developing and marketing hybrid seed corn and improved chickens before his death in 1965 of amyotrophic lateral sclerosis.

== Early life and education ==
Henry Agard Wallace was born on October 7, 1888, on a farm near Orient, Iowa, to Henry Cantwell Wallace and Carrie May Brodhead. Wallace had two younger brothers and three younger sisters. His paternal grandfather, "Uncle Henry" Wallace, was a prominent landowner, newspaper editor, Republican activist, and Social Gospel advocate in Adair County, Iowa. Uncle Henry's father, John Wallace, was an Ulster-Scots immigrant from the village of Kilrea in County Londonderry, Ireland, who arrived in Philadelphia in 1823. May (née Broadhead) was born in New York City but was raised by an aunt in Muscatine, Iowa, after her parents' death.

Wallace's family moved to Ames, Iowa, in 1892 and to Des Moines, Iowa, in 1896. In 1894, the Wallaces established an agricultural newspaper, Wallaces Farmer. It became extremely successful and made the family wealthy and politically influential. Wallace took a strong interest in agriculture and plants from a young age, when his father, a professor of dairying at Iowa State Agricultural College, invited his student, African-American botanist George Washington Carver, to stay with them in the Wallace home, since Carver was barred from college housing because of his race. In gratitude, Carver took the young Henry Wallace under his wing, giving him tutorials after school on botany and plant breeding. Wallace was particularly interested in corn, Iowa's key crop. In 1904, he devised an experiment that disproved agronomist Perry Greeley Holden's assertion that the most aesthetically pleasing corn would produce the greatest yield. Wallace graduated from West High School in 1906 and enrolled in Iowa State College later that year, majoring in animal husbandry. He joined the Hawkeye Club, a fraternal organization, and spent much of his free time continuing to study corn. He also organized a political club to support Gifford Pinchot, a Progressive Republican who was head of the United States Forest Service.

== Journalist and farmer ==
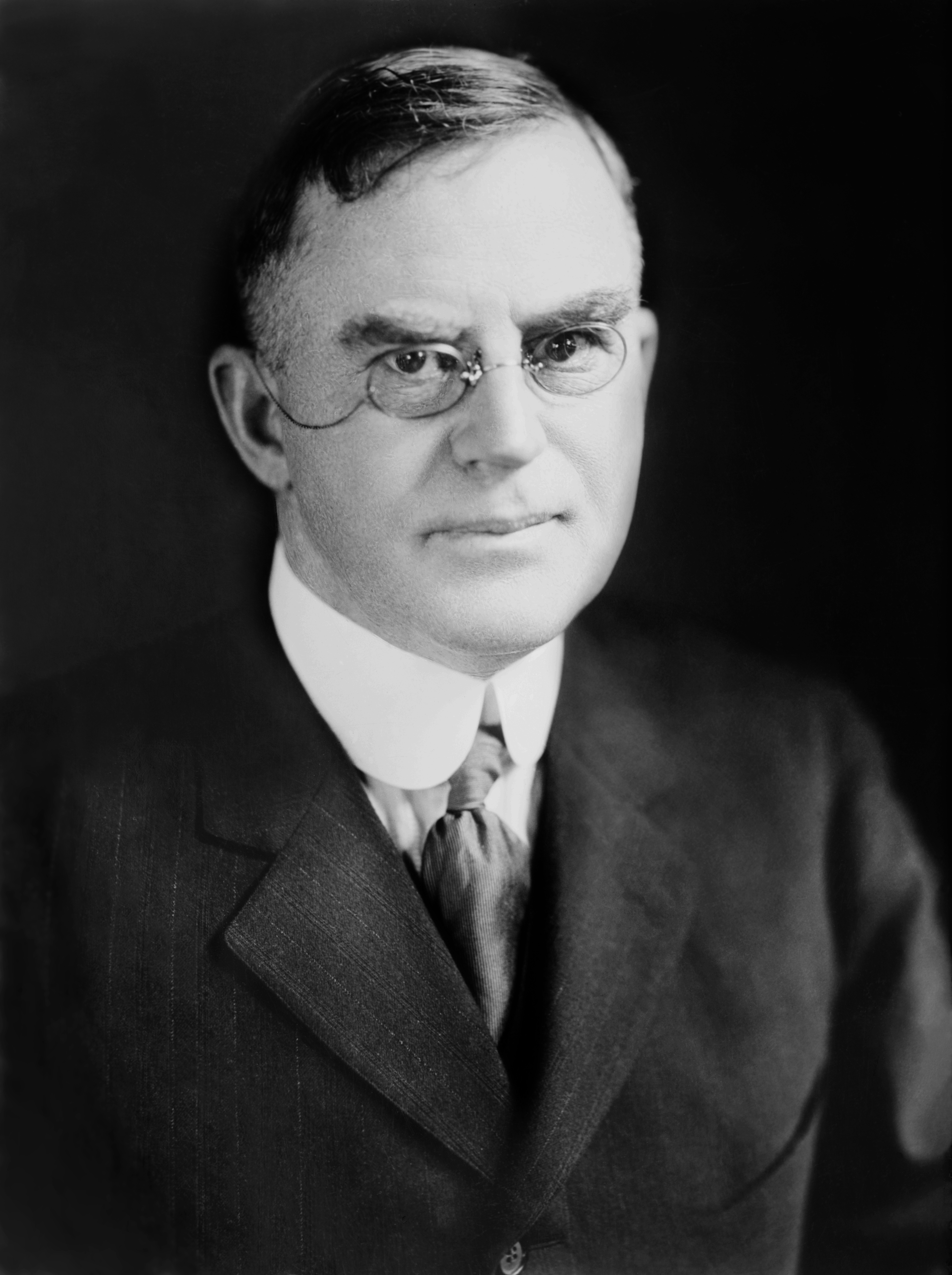
Wallace's father, Henry Cantwell Wallace, served as secretary of agriculture from 1921 to his death in 1924.

Wallace became a full-time writer and editor for Wallace's Farmer after graduating from college in 1910. He was deeply interested in using mathematics and economics in agriculture and learned calculus as part of an effort to understand hog prices. He also wrote an influential article with pioneering statistician George W. Snedecor on computational methods for correlations and regressions. After his grandfather died in 1916, Wallace and his father became the coeditors of Wallace's Farmer. In 1921, Wallace assumed leadership of the paper after his father accepted an appointment as Secretary of Agriculture under President Warren G. Harding. His uncle lost ownership of the paper in 1932 during the Great Depression, and Wallace stopped serving as editor in 1933.

In 1914, Wallace and his wife, Ilo Browne, purchased a farm near Johnston, Iowa; they initially attempted to combine corn production with dairy farming, but later turned their full attention to corn. Influenced by Edward Murray East, Wallace focused on producing hybrid corn, developing a variety called Copper Cross. In 1923, he reached the first-ever contract for hybrid seed production, agreeing to grant the Iowa Seed Company the sole right to grow and sell Copper Cross corn. In 1926, he co-founded the Hi-Bred Corn Company to develop and produce hybrid corn. It initially turned only a small profit, but eventually became a massive financial success. Later, Wallace's financial interests in the farming industry stoked controversy when Hi-Bred seed was advertised in conjunction with government farm policies enacted during the New Deal.

== Early political involvement ==
During World War I, Wallace and his father helped the United States Food Administration (USFA) develop policies to increase hog production. After USFA director Herbert Hoover abandoned the hog production policies the Wallaces favored, the elder Wallace joined an effort to deny Hoover the presidential nomination at the 1920 Republican National Convention. Partly in response to Hoover, the younger Wallace published Agricultural Prices, in which he advocated government policies to control agricultural prices. He also warned farmers of an imminent price collapse after the war. Wallace's prediction proved accurate: a farm crisis extended into the 1920s. Reflecting a broader decrease in agricultural prices, corn prices fell from $1.68 per bushel in 1918 to $0.42 per bushel in 1921. Wallace proposed various remedies to combat the farm crisis, which he believed stemmed primarily from overproduction. Among his proposed policies was the "ever-normal granary": the government buys and stores agricultural surpluses when agricultural prices are low and sells them when they are high.

Both Wallaces backed the McNary–Haugen Farm Relief Bill, which would have required the federal government to market and export agricultural surpluses in foreign markets. The bill was defeated in large part because of the opposition of President Calvin Coolidge and Commerce Secretary Hoover. When Coolidge became president after Harding died in 1923, the elder Wallace stayed on as Agriculture Secretary but died at age 58 in October 1924. His son, Henry, always blamed his father's premature death on Hoover, because of the stress of the titanic policy battles they had over matters like the McNary-Haugen bill, with Hoover insisting on a hands-off "laissez-faire" attitude toward business and Wallace pushing more active government interventions to help farmers. In the November 1924 presidential election, Wallace voted for the Progressive nominee, Robert La Follette. Due in part to Wallace's continued lobbying, and despite fervent opposition from Hoover, Congress passed the McNary–Haugen bill in 1927 and 1928, but Coolidge vetoed the bill both times. Dissatisfied with both major party candidates in the 1928 presidential election, Wallace advocated for the creation of a new party to unite the interests of the Western and Southern branches of the Democratic Party against its Eastern wing, but did not advance the idea beyond the conceptual stage. In the lead-up to the fall presidential election, Wallace attempted to persuade Illinois Governor Frank Lowden to run for president. He ultimately supported Democratic nominee Al Smith, but Hoover won a landslide victory. The onset of the Great Depression during Hoover's administration devastated Iowa farmers, as farm income fell by two-thirds from 1929 to 1932. In the 1932 presidential election, Wallace campaigned for Democratic nominee Franklin D. Roosevelt, who favored the agricultural policies of Wallace and economist M. L. Wilson. Although his family was traditionally Republican, Wallace gradually came to support the Democratic Party, and became a registered Democrat in 1936.

== Secretary of Agriculture ==
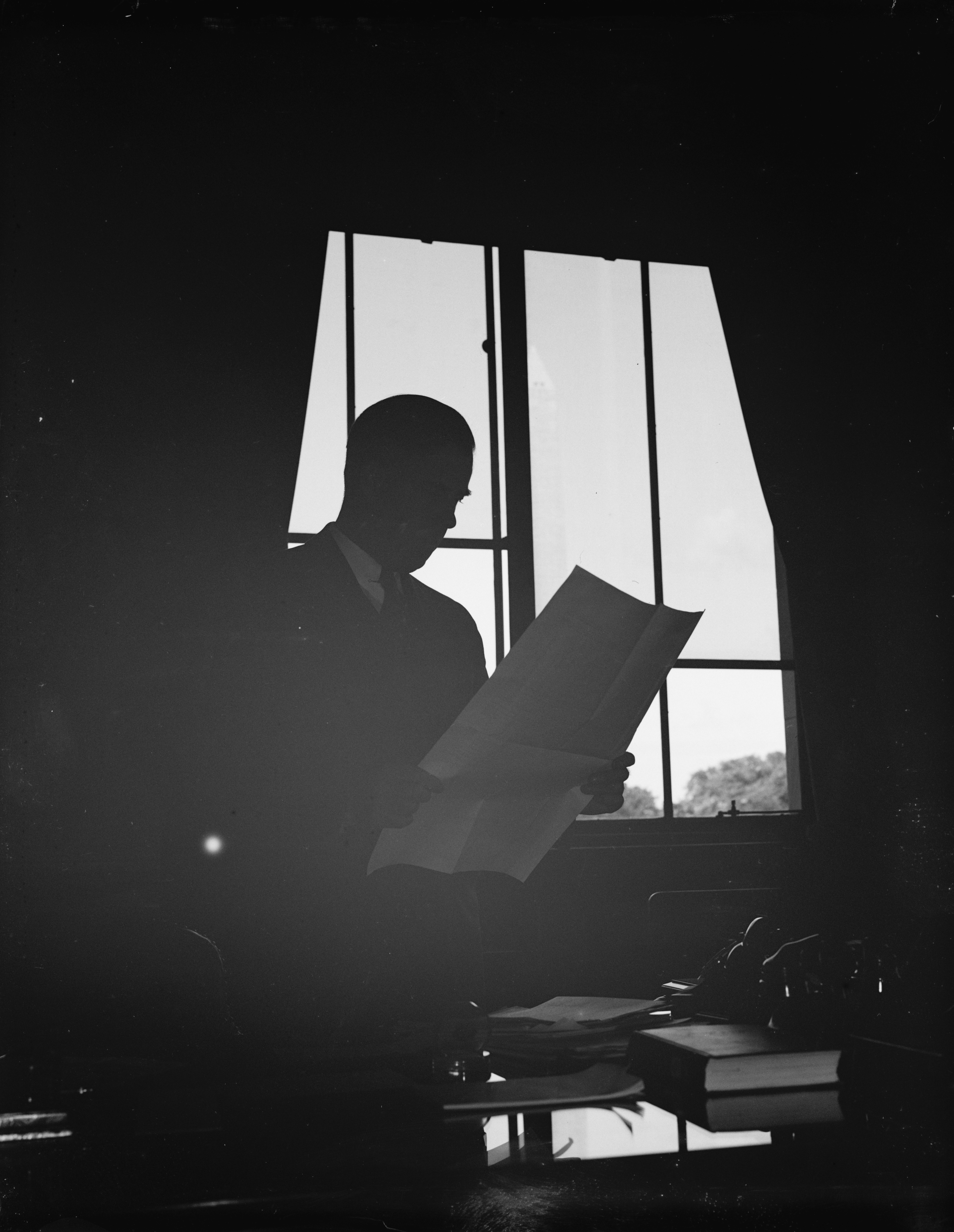
Wallace in his office at the Department of Agriculture, 1938

After Roosevelt won the 1932 presidential election, he appointed Wallace as secretary of agriculture. Despite his past affiliation with the Republican Party, Wallace strongly supported Roosevelt and his New Deal domestic program, and became a registered member of the Democratic Party in 1936. Upon taking office, Wallace appointed Rexford Tugwell, a member of Roosevelt's "Brain Trust" of important advisers, as his deputy secretary. Though Roosevelt was initially focused primarily on addressing the banking crisis, Wallace and Tugwell convinced him of the necessity of quickly passing major agricultural reforms. Roosevelt, Wallace, and House Agriculture Committee Chairman John Marvin Jones rallied congressional support around the Agricultural Adjustment Act, which established the Agricultural Adjustment Administration (AAA). The AAA's aim was to raise prices for commodities through artificial scarcity by using a system of "domestic allotments" that set the total output of agricultural products. It paid land owners subsidies to leave some of their land idle. Farm income increased significantly in the first three years of the New Deal, as prices for commodities rose. After the Agricultural Adjustment Act passed, Agriculture became the federal government's largest department.

The Supreme Court struck down the Agricultural Adjustment Act in the 1936 case United States v. Butler. Wallace strongly disagreed with the Court's holding that agriculture was a "purely local activity" and thus could not be regulated by the federal government, saying, "were agriculture truly a local matter in 1936, as the Supreme Court says it is, half of the people of the United States would quickly starve." He quickly proposed a new agriculture program designed to satisfy the Supreme Court's objections; under the new program, the federal government would reach rental agreements with farmers to plant green manure rather than crops like corn and wheat. Less than two months after the Supreme Court decided United States v. Butler, Roosevelt signed the Soil Conservation and Domestic Allotment Act of 1936 into law. In the 1936 presidential election, Wallace was an important surrogate in Roosevelt's campaign.

In 1935, Wallace fired general counsel Jerome Frank and some other Agriculture Department officials who sought to help Southern sharecroppers by issuing a reinterpretation of the Agricultural Adjustment Act. He became more committed to aiding sharecroppers and other groups of impoverished farmers during a trip to the South in late 1936, after which he wrote, "I have never seen among the peasantry of Europe poverty so abject as that which exists in this favorable cotton year in the great cotton states." He helped lead passage of the Bankhead–Jones Farm Tenant Act of 1937, which authorized the federal government to issue loans to tenant farmers so that they could purchase land and equipment. The law also established the Farm Security Administration, (Note: The Farm Security Administration succeeded the Resettlement Administration, which had been an independent agency.) which was charged with ameliorating rural poverty, within the Agriculture Department. He also played a key role in major New Deal successes that ended up in other cabinet departments, such as serving on the committee that got Social Security enacted in 1935 (the Committee on Economic Security, chaired by Labor Secretary Frances Perkins), and the interagency committee that designed the Civilian Conservation Corps, which created millions of public jobs in natural resource conservation and infrastructure building between 1933 and 1941 and was administered jointly by the Departments of Labor and Interior and the Army.

The failure of Roosevelt's Judicial Procedures Reform Bill of 1937 (the "court-packing plan"), the onset of the Recession of 1937–1938, and a wave of strikes led by John L. Lewis badly damaged the Roosevelt administration's ability to pass major legislation after 1936. Nonetheless, Wallace helped lead passage of the Agricultural Adjustment Act of 1938, which implemented Wallace's ever-normal granary plan. Between 1932 and 1940, the Agriculture Department grew from 40,000 employees and an annual budget of $280 million to 146,000 employees and an annual budget of $1.5 billion.

A Republican wave in the 1938 elections effectively brought an end to the New Deal legislative program, and the Roosevelt administration increasingly focused on foreign policy. Unlike many Midwestern progressives, Wallace supported internationalist policies, such as Secretary of State Cordell Hull's efforts to lower tariffs. He joined Roosevelt in attacking the aggressive actions of Nazi Germany and the Empire of Japan, and in one speech derided Nazi eugenics as "mumbo-jumbo of dangerous nonsense". After World War II broke out in September 1939, Wallace supported Roosevelt's program of military buildup and, anticipating hostilities with Germany, pushed for initiatives like a synthetic rubber program and closer trade relations with Latin American countries.

== Vice presidency (1941–1945) ==
=== Election of 1940 ===
1940 electoral vote results

As Roosevelt refused to commit to either retiring or seeking reelection (Note: The Twenty-second Amendment, ratified in 1951, would later prevent presidents from running for a third term.) during his second term, supporters of Wallace and other leading Democrats such as Vice President John Nance Garner and Postmaster General James Farley laid the groundwork for their presidential campaigns in the 1940 election. After the outbreak of World War II in Europe in September 1939, Wallace publicly endorsed Roosevelt for an unprecedented third term. Though Roosevelt never announced his candidacy, the 1940 Democratic National Convention nominated him for president. Shortly after being nominated, Roosevelt told Democratic party leaders that he would not run without Wallace as his running mate. Roosevelt chose Wallace because of his loyalty to the Roosevelt administration, his handling of aid to the United Kingdom, and because he hoped that Wallace would appeal to agricultural voters. A recent convert to the Democratic Party, Wallace was not popular among the big-city bosses and southern segregationists, and had never been tested in an election. Delegates to the 1940 Democratic convention "turned ugly on Wallace", recalled Labor Secretary Frances Perkins, one of Wallace's strongest supporters, who had previously urged Wallace to run for president if Roosevelt did not. Roosevelt's response was to send his wife Eleanor to Chicago to convince the delegates to accept Wallace as his running mate. The result was her most famous speech, captured in the title of Doris Kearns Goodwin's seminal book on the Roosevelt presidency, No Ordinary Time. With world war looming, she warned that "this is no ordinary time", and of Wallace's nomination, she warned that "you cannot treat this as you would an ordinary nomination in an ordinary time". The speech had "a magical calming effect" and has been credited for Wallace's winning the nomination by a wide margin.

Though many Democrats were disappointed by Wallace's nomination, it was generally well received by newspapers. Arthur Krock of The New York Times wrote that Wallace was "able, thoughtful, honorable—the best of the New Deal type." Wallace left office as Secretary of Agriculture in September 1940, and was succeeded by Undersecretary of Agriculture Claude R. Wickard. The Roosevelt campaign settled on a strategy of keeping Roosevelt largely out of the fray of the election, leaving most of the campaigning to Wallace and other surrogates. Wallace was dispatched to the Midwest, giving speeches in states like Iowa, Illinois, and Missouri. He made foreign affairs the main focus of his campaigning, telling one audience that "the replacement of Roosevelt ... would cause [Adolf] Hitler to rejoice." Both campaigns predicted a close election, but Roosevelt won 449 of the 531 electoral votes and the popular vote by nearly ten points.

After the election but before being sworn in as vice president, Wallace took a long trip to Mexico as FDR's goodwill ambassador, conveying messages of Pan-Americanism and Roosevelt's Good Neighbor policy. He spent much time visiting farmers in their fields, and came away appalled at Mexican farms' meager crop yields; to produce one bushel of corn, a Mexican farmer worked 500 hours, compared to the 10 hours it took an Iowa farmer using hybrid seeds from the company Wallace had founded in 1926, Pioneer Hi-Bred International. Upon his return, Wallace convinced the Rockefeller Foundation to establish an agricultural station in Mexico, the first of many such centers the Rockefeller Foundation and the Ford Foundation established. (Note: Norman Borlaug would later credit Wallace as a key initiator of the Green Revolution.) Wallace recommended hiring a young Iowa agronomist, Norman Borlaug, to run the agricultural station, which ultimately led to vast increases in crop yields of corn and wheat in Mexico and around the world, in what was later called the Green Revolution, which is credited with saving two billion people from starvation and earned Borlaug the 1970 Nobel Peace Prize and Presidential Medal of Freedom.

=== Tenure ===
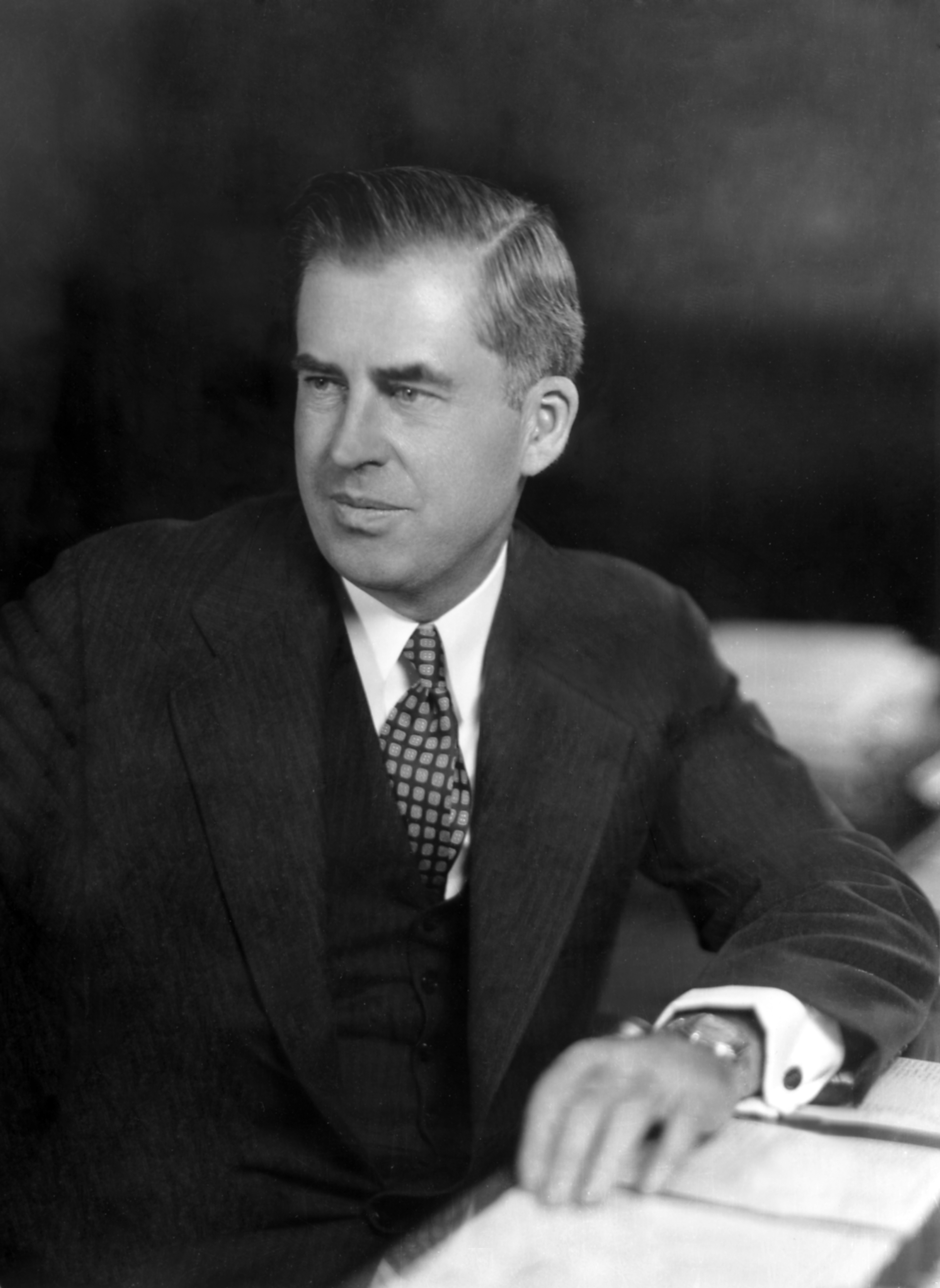
Wallace c. 1940

Wallace was sworn in as vice president on January 20, 1941. He quickly grew frustrated with his ceremonial role as the presiding officer of the United States Senate, the one duty the Constitution assigns the vice president. He had gone from running an agency with a budget of $1 billion and 146,000 employees to a budget of $11,000 and a staff of four. In July 1941, Roosevelt named Wallace chairman of the Board of Economic Warfare (BEW) (Note: The BEW was originally known as the Economic Defense Board) and of the Supply Priorities and Allocations Board (SPAB). These appointments gave him a voice in organizing national mobilization for war. One journalist noted that Roosevelt made Wallace the first "Vice President to work really as the number two man in government—a conception of the vice presidency popularly held but never realized." Reflecting Wallace's role in organizing mobilization efforts, many journalists began calling him the "Assistant President". Wallace was also named to the Top Policy Group, which, just days after the Pearl Harbor attack, presented Roosevelt with a plan for the development of nuclear weapons, which Roosevelt approved and promised to fund. This became the Manhattan Project, which developed the atomic bombs dropped on Hiroshima and Nagasaki, with Wallace serving continually as an informal link between Roosevelt and the project's leaders.

The Century of the Common Man (excerpt)

"Some have spoken of the "American Century." I say that the century on which we are entering—the century which will come into being after this war—can be and must be the century of the common man.

Perhaps it will be America's opportunity to—to support the Freedom[s] and Duties by which the common man must live. Everywhere, the common man must learn to build his own industries with his own hands in practical fashion. Everywhere, the common man must learn to increase his productivity so that he and his children can eventually pay to the world community all that they have received. No nation will have the God-given right to exploit other nations. Older nations will have the privilege to help younger nations get started on the path to industrialization, but there must be neither military nor economic imperialism."

Economic conditions became chaotic, and Roosevelt decided new leadership was needed. In early 1942 he established the War Production Board with businessman Donald Nelson in charge and Wallace as a member. Wallace continued to serve as head of the BEW, now charged with importing the raw materials such as rubber necessary for war production. He used his BEW position to demand that American purchases in Latin America raise the standard of living of the workers there. In the process he clashed privately with Secretary of State Cordell Hull, who opposed American interference in another state's internal affairs. The national media dramatically covered Wallace's public battle with Jesse H. Jones, the Secretary of Commerce who was also in charge of the Reconstruction Finance Corporation (RFC), which paid the bills for the purchases BEW made. Roosevelt's standard strategy for executive management was to give two different people the same role, expecting controversy would result. He wanted the agencies' heads to bring the controversy to him so he could make the decision. On August 21, 1942, Roosevelt explicitly wrote to all his department heads that disagreements "should not be publicly aired, but are to be submitted to me by the appropriate heads of the conflicting agencies." Anyone going public had to resign. Wallace denounced Jones for blocking funding for purchases of raw materials in Latin America needed for the war effort. Jones called on Congress and the public for help, calling Wallace a liar. According to James MacGregor Burns, Jones, a leader of Southern conservative Democrats, was "taciturn, shrewd, practical, cautious". Wallace, deeply distrusted by Democratic party leaders, was the "hero of the Lib Labs, dreamy, utopian, even mystical, yet with his own bent for management and power." On July 15, 1943, Roosevelt stripped both men of their roles in the matter. BEW was reorganized as the Office of Economic Warfare, and put under Leo Crowley. The loss of the BEW was a major blow to Wallace's prestige. He now had no agency and a weak political base on the left wing of the Democratic Party. But he still had visibility, ambition and an articulate voice, and remained a loyal Roosevelt supporter. He was not renominated for vice president but in 1945 Roosevelt fired Jones and made Wallace Secretary of Commerce.

On May 8, 1942, Wallace delivered what became his best-remembered speech, known for containing the phrase "the Century of the Common Man". He cast World War II as a war between a "free world" and a "slave world", and held that "peace must mean a better standard of living for the common man, not merely in the United States and England, but also in India, Russia, China, and Latin America—not merely in the United Nations, but also in Germany and Italy and Japan". Some conservatives disliked the speech, but it was translated into 20 languages and millions of copies were distributed around the world.

In early 1943, Wallace was dispatched on a goodwill tour of Latin America; he made 24 stops across Central America and South America. Partly due to his ability to deliver speeches in Spanish, Wallace received a warm reception; one State Department official said, "never in Chilean history has any foreigner ever been received with such extravagance and evidently sincere enthusiasm". During his trip, several Latin American countries declared war against Germany. Back home, Wallace continued to deliver speeches, saying after the 1943 Detroit race riot, "we cannot fight to crush Nazi brutality abroad and condone race riots at home". Though Congress largely blocked Roosevelt's domestic agenda, Wallace continued to call for progressive programs; one newspaper wrote that "the New Deal today is Henry Wallace ... the New Deal banner in his hands is not yet furled". Wallace was elected to the American Philosophical Society in 1943.

"The American people have always had guts and always will have." — Henry A. Wallace

In mid-1944, Wallace toured the Soviet Union, China, and Mongolia. The USSR presented its American guests with a fully sanitized version of gulag labor camps in Magadan and Kolyma, claiming that all the workers were volunteers. Wallace was impressed by the camp at Magadan, describing it as a "combination Tennessee Valley Authority and Hudson's Bay Company". (Note: Wallace later regretted his praise of the camp at Magadan, writing in 1952 that he "had not the slightest idea when I visited Magadan that this ... was also the center for administering the labor of both criminals and those suspected of political disloyalty".) He received a warm reception in the Soviet Union, but was largely unsuccessful in his efforts to negotiate with Chinese leader Chiang Kai-shek. Wallace met with Mongolian leader Khorloogiin Choibalsan in Ulaanbaatar. His request to visit Gandantegchinlen Monastery is sometimes credited as having helped save the monastery from destruction.

=== Election of 1944 ===
After the abolition of the BEW, speculation began as to whether Roosevelt would drop Wallace from the ticket in the 1944 election. Gallup polling published in March 1944 showed that Wallace was clearly the most popular choice for vice president among Democrats, and many journalists predicted that he would win renomination. As Roosevelt was in declining health, party leaders expected that the party's vice-presidential nominee would eventually succeed Roosevelt, and Wallace's many enemies within the Democratic Party organized to ensure his removal. Much of the opposition to Wallace stemmed from his open denunciation of racial segregation in the South, but others were concerned by Wallace's unorthodox religious views and pro-Soviet statements. Shortly before the 1944 Democratic National Convention, party leaders such as Robert E. Hannegan and Edwin W. Pauley convinced Roosevelt to sign a document expressing support for either Associate Justice William O. Douglas or Senator Harry S. Truman for the vice-presidential nomination. Nonetheless, Wallace got Roosevelt to send a public letter to the convention chairman in which he wrote, "I personally would vote for [Wallace's] renomination if I were a delegate to the convention".

With Roosevelt not committed to keeping or dropping Wallace, the vice-presidential balloting turned into a battle between those who favored Wallace and those who favored Truman. Wallace did not have an effective organization to support his candidacy, though allies like Calvin Benham Baldwin, Claude Pepper, and Joseph F. Guffey pressed for him. Truman, meanwhile, was reluctant to put forward his own candidacy, but Hannegan (Note: Hannegan later stated that he would like his tombstone to read, "here lies the man who stopped Henry Wallace from becoming President of the United States".) and Roosevelt persuaded him to run. At the convention, Wallace galvanized supporters with a well-received speech in which he lauded Roosevelt and argued that "the future belongs to those who go down the line unswervingly for the liberal principles of both political democracy and economic democracy regardless of race, color, or religion". After Roosevelt delivered his acceptance speech, the crowd began chanting for the nomination of Wallace, but Samuel D. Jackson adjourned the convention for the day before Wallace supporters could call for the beginning of vice presidential balloting. Party leaders worked furiously to line up support for Truman overnight, but Wallace received 429 1/2 votes (589 were needed for nomination) on the first ballot for vice president and Truman 319 1/2, with the rest going to various favorite son candidates. On the second ballot, many delegates who had voted for favorite sons shifted into Truman's camp, giving him the nomination.

On January 20, 1945, Wallace swore in Truman as his vice-presidential successor.

== Secretary of Commerce (1945–1946) ==
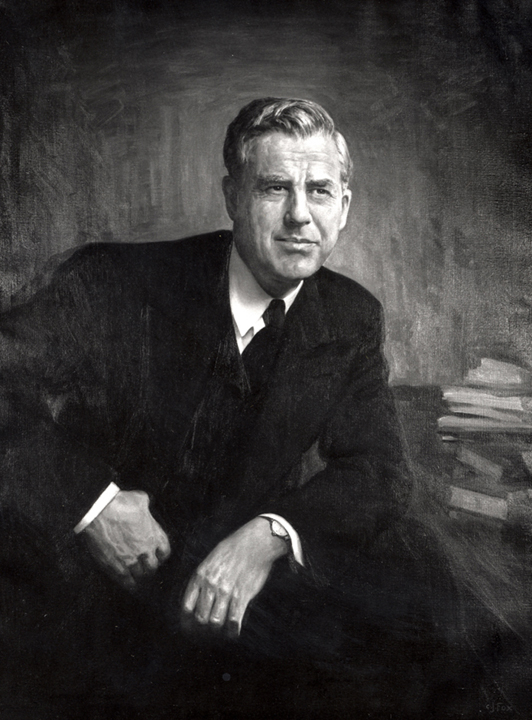
Secretary of Commerce Henry Wallace

Wallace believed that Democratic party leaders had unfairly stolen the vice-presidential nomination from him, but he supported Roosevelt in the 1944 presidential election. Hoping to mend ties with Wallace, Roosevelt offered him any position in the Cabinet other than secretary of state, and Wallace asked to replace Jones as secretary of commerce. In that position, Wallace expected to play a key role in the economy's postwar transition. In January 1945, with the end of Wallace's vice presidency, Roosevelt nominated Wallace for secretary of commerce. The nomination prompted an intense debate, as many senators objected to his support for liberal policies designed to boost wages and employment. Conservatives failed to block the nomination, but Senator Walter F. George led passage of a measure removing the Reconstruction Finance Corporation from the Commerce Department. After Roosevelt signed George's bill, Wallace was confirmed by a vote of 56 to 32 on March 1, 1945.

Roosevelt died on April 12, 1945, and was succeeded by Truman. Truman quickly replaced most other senior Roosevelt appointees, (Note: After the resignation of Harold L. Ickes in February 1946, Wallace was the lone remaining holdover from Roosevelt's Cabinet.) but retained Wallace, who remained very popular with liberal Democrats. The discontent of liberal leaders strengthened Wallace's position in the Cabinet; Truman privately stated that the two most important members of his "political team" were Wallace and Eleanor Roosevelt. As secretary of commerce, Wallace advocated a "middle course" between the planned economy of the Soviet Union and the laissez-faire economics that had dominated the United States before the Great Depression. With his congressional allies, he led passage of the Employment Act of 1946. Conservatives blocked the inclusion of a measure providing for full employment, but the act established the Council of Economic Advisers and the Joint Economic Committee to study economic matters. Wallace's proposal to establish international control over nuclear weapons was not adopted, but he did help pass the Atomic Energy Act of 1946, which established the United States Atomic Energy Commission to oversee domestic development of nuclear power.

World War II ended in September 1945 with the surrender of Japan, and relations with the USSR became a central matter of foreign policy. Various issues, including the fate of European and Asian postwar governments and the administration of the United Nations, had already begun to strain the wartime alliance between the Soviet Union and the United States. Critics of the USSR objected to the oppressive satellite states it had established in Eastern Europe and Soviet involvement in the Greek Civil War and the Chinese Civil War. In February 1946, George F. Kennan laid out the doctrine of containment, which called for the United States to resist the spread of Communism. Wallace feared that confrontational policies toward the Soviet Union would eventually lead to war, and urged Truman to "allay any reasonable Russian grounds for fear, suspicion, and distrust". Historian Tony Judt wrote in Postwar that Wallace's "distaste for American involvement with Britain and Europe was widely shared across the political spectrum".

Though Wallace was dissatisfied with Truman's increasingly confrontational policies toward the Soviet Union, he remained an integral part of Truman's Cabinet during the first half of 1946. He broke with administration policies in September 1946 when he delivered a speech in which he stated that "we should recognize that we have no more business in the political affairs of Eastern Europe than Russia has in the political affairs of Latin America, Western Europe and the United States". Wallace's speech was booed by the pro-Soviet crowd he delivered it to and even more strongly criticized by Truman administration officials and leading Republicans like Robert A. Taft and Arthur Vandenberg. Truman stated that Wallace's speech did not represent administration policy but merely Wallace's personal views, and on September 20 he demanded and received Wallace's resignation.

Some have claimed that Wallace was sympathetic to the Soviet Union regime. In 1946, Wallace wrote Soviet Asian Mission, a book about his 1944 trip to the Soviet Union. It generated criticism that he was overly sympathetic to Stalin's government.

== 1948 presidential election ==
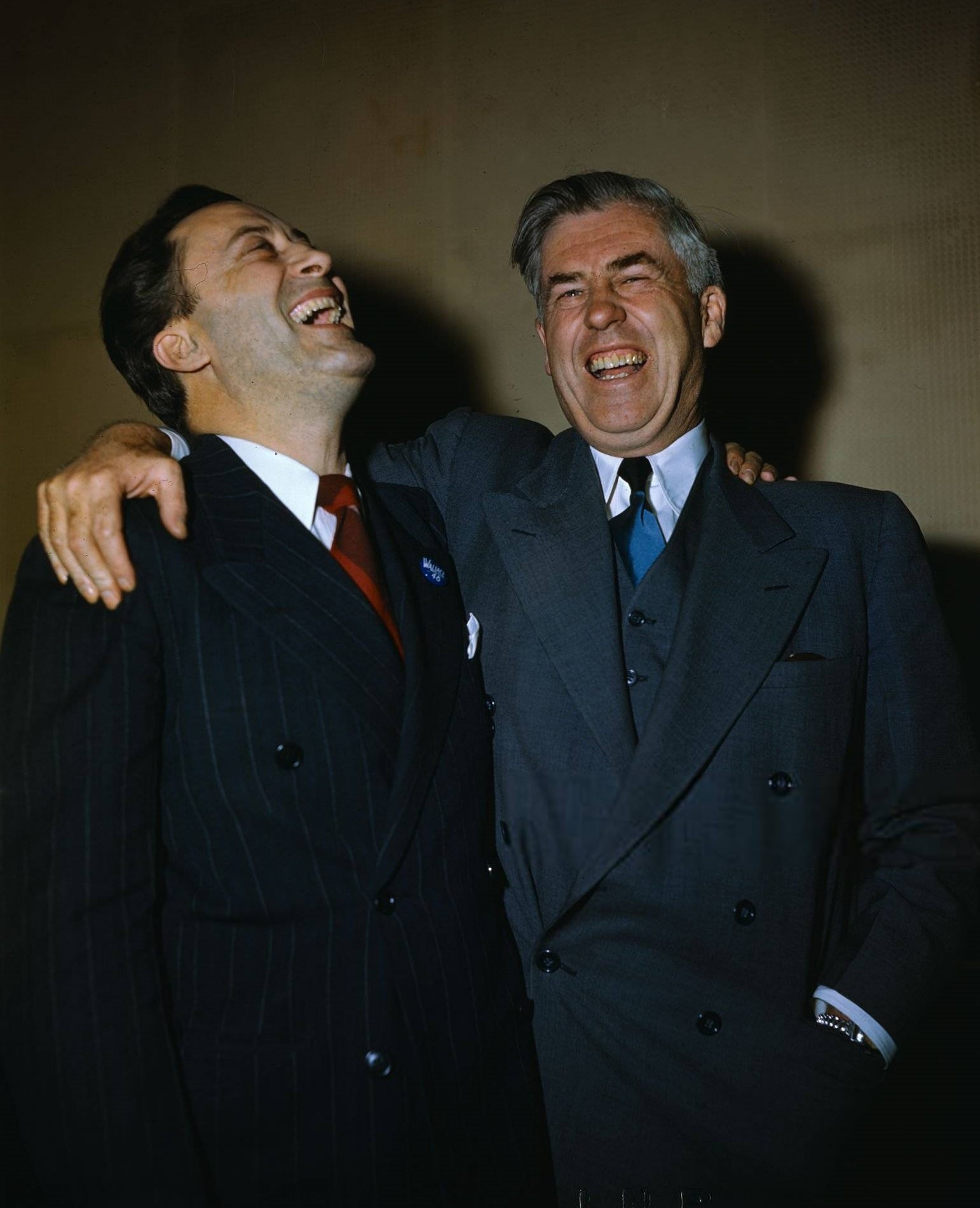
Wallace with his running mate, Senator Glen H. Taylor, 1948

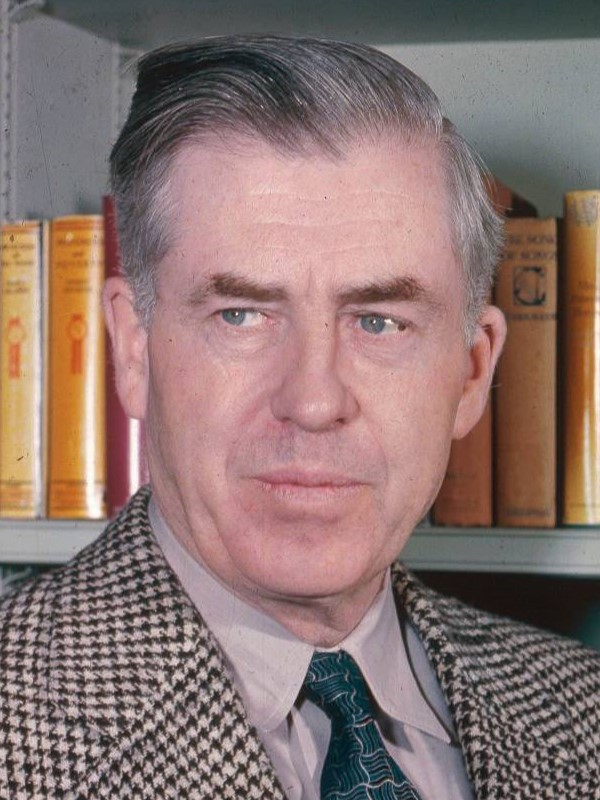
Wallace at home in New York, 1948

Shortly after leaving office, Wallace became the editor of The New Republic, a progressive magazine. He also helped establish the Progressive Citizens of America (PCA), a progressive political organization that called for good relations with the Soviet Union and more liberal programs at home. Though not a member of the PCA, Wallace was widely regarded as the organization's leader and was criticized for the PCA's acceptance of Communist members. In response to the creation of the PCA, anti-Communist liberals established a rival group, Americans for Democratic Action (ADA), which explicitly rejected any association with Communism. Wallace strongly criticized the president in early 1947 after Truman promulgated the Truman Doctrine to oppose Communist threats to Greece and Turkey. Wallace also opposed Truman's Executive Order 9835, which began a purge of government workers affiliated with Communist groups deemed to be subversive. He initially favored the Marshall Plan, but later opposed it because he believed the program should have been administered through the United Nations. Wallace and the PCA were scrutinized by the FBI and the House Un-American Activities Committee, both of which sought to uncover evidence of Communist influence.

Robert W. Kenny, the former Attorney General of California, launched an effort to elect delegates pledged to Wallace for the 1948 Democratic National Convention. If this effort failed then they would launch a third-party campaign with Wallace as their presidential nominee.

Many in the PCA favored the establishment of a third party, but other longtime Wallace allies warned him against leaving the Democratic Party. On December 29, 1947, Wallace launched a third-party campaign, declaring, "we have assembled a Gideon's Army, small in number, powerful in conviction ... We face the future unfettered, unfettered by any principle but the general welfare". He was backed by many intellectuals and Hollywood and Broadway celebrities. Among his prominent supporters were Rexford Tugwell, Congressmen Vito Marcantonio and Leo Isacson, actress Ava Gardner, musicians Paul Robeson and Pete Seeger, and future presidential nominee George McGovern. Calvin Baldwin became Wallace's campaign manager and took charge of fundraising and ensuring that Wallace appeared on as many state ballots as possible. Wallace's first choice for running mate, Claude Pepper, refused to leave the Democratic Party. O. John Rogge actively sought to be Wallace's running mate, but was from the same state as Wallace, which would prevent New York electors from voting for them. Rogge was also unknown outside the eastern United States. Democratic Senator Glen H. Taylor of Idaho agreed to serve as Wallace's running mate.

Wallace accepted the endorsement of the Communist Party USA, saying: "I'm not following their line. If they want to follow my line, I say God bless 'em". Truman responded to Wallace's left-wing challenge by pressing for liberal domestic policies, while pro-ADA liberals like Hubert Humphrey, Robert F. Wagner, and James Roosevelt linked Wallace to the Soviet Union and the Communist Party. Many Americans came to see Wallace as a fellow traveler to Communists, a view reinforced by Wallace's refusal to condemn the 1948 Czechoslovak coup d'état. In early 1948, the CIO and the AFL both rejected Wallace, with the AFL denouncing him as a "front, spokesman, and apologist for the Communist Party". With Wallace's foreign policy views overshadowing his domestic policy views, many liberals who had previously favored his candidacy returned to the Democratic fold.

State Level Performance for Henry A. Wallace's Presidential Campaign, 1948

Wallace embarked on a nationwide speaking tour to support his candidacy, encountering resistance in both the North and South. He openly defied the Jim Crow regime in the South, refusing to speak before segregated audiences. Time magazine, which opposed Wallace's candidacy, described him as "ostentatiously" riding through the towns and cities of the segregated South "with his Negro secretary beside him". A barrage of eggs and tomatoes were hurled at Wallace and struck him and his campaign members during the tour. State authorities in Virginia sidestepped enforcing their own segregation laws by declaring Wallace's campaign gatherings private parties. The Pittsburgh Press began publishing the names of known Wallace supporters. Scores of Wallace supporters in colleges and high schools lost their positions. A supporter of Zionism, Wallace sought to deny Truman Jewish votes by promising to end the arms embargo on Israel, which was currently fighting the 1948 Arab–Israeli War.

With strong financial support from Anita McCormick Blaine, Wallace exceeded fundraising goals, and appeared on the ballot of every state except for Oklahoma, Nebraska, and Illinois. The campaign distributed 25 million copies of 140 fliers and pamphlets. Nevertheless, Gallup polls showed support for Wallace falling from 7% in December 1947 to 5% in June 1948. He was endorsed by only two newspapers: the Communist Daily Worker in New York and The Gazette and Daily in York, Pennsylvania. Some in the press began to speculate that Wallace would drop out of the race.

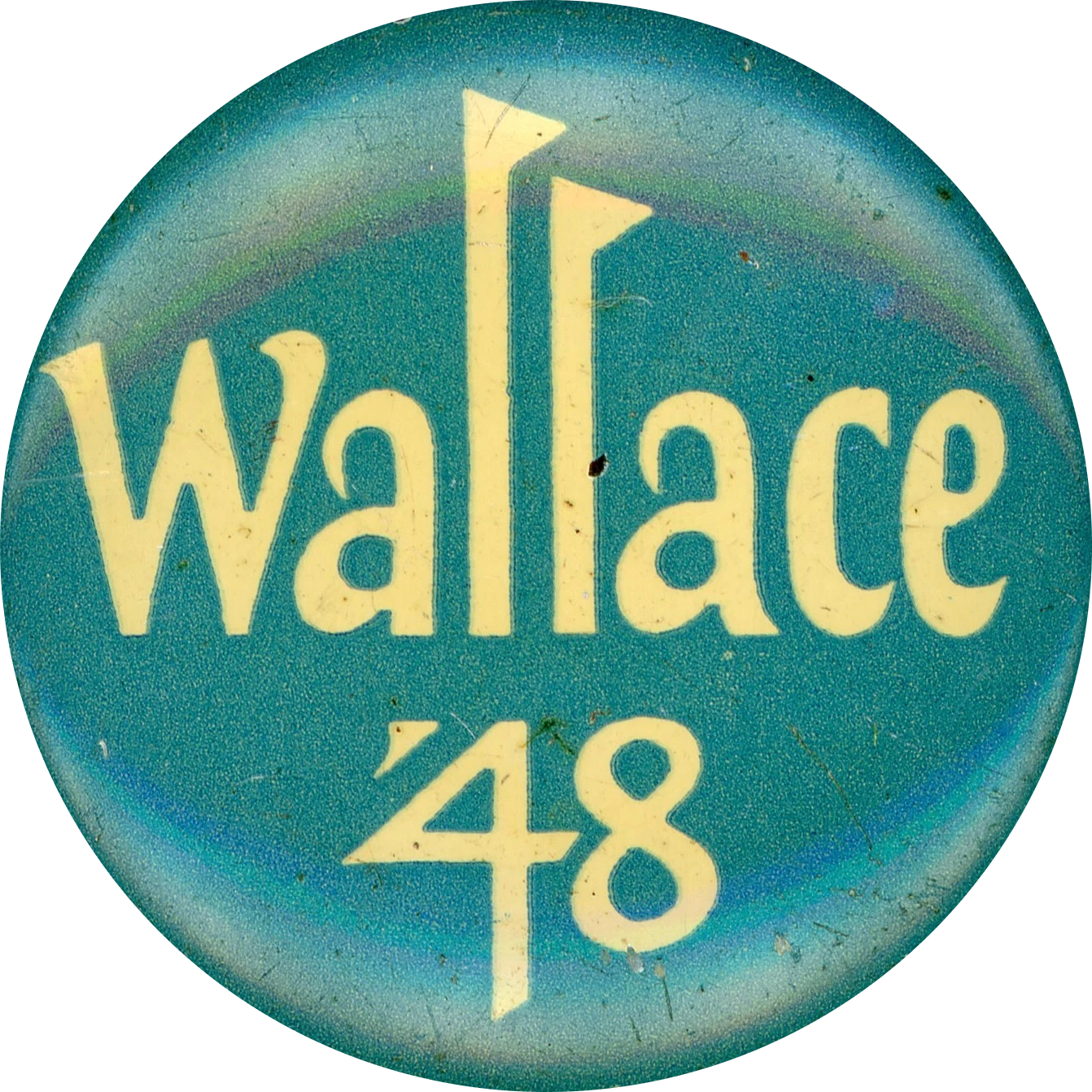
Wallace Progressive Party 1948 campaign pin

Wallace's supporters held a national convention in Philadelphia in July, formally establishing a new Progressive Party. (Note: The party was influenced by, and took the same name as, defunct parties that had backed Theodore Roosevelt (in 1912) and Robert M. La Follette (in 1924).) The party platform addressed a wide array of issues, and included support for the desegregation of public schools, gender equality, a national health insurance program, free trade, and public ownership of large banks, railroads, and power utilities. (Note: Wallace did not dictate the party platform, and he personally opposed public ownership of banks, railroads, and utilities.) The party was described as "progressively capitalist". Another part of the platform stated, "responsibility for ending the tragic prospect of war is a joint responsibility of the Soviet Union and the United States". During the convention, Wallace was asked about letters he had written to guru Nicholas Roerich; his refusal to comment on the letters was widely criticized. Wallace was further damaged days after the convention when Whittaker Chambers and Elizabeth Bentley testified before the House Un-American Activities Committee that several government officials associated with Wallace (including Alger Hiss and John Abt) were Communist infiltrators. Meanwhile, many Southern Democrats, outraged by the Democratic Party's pro-civil rights plank, formed the States' Rights Democratic Party and nominated Strom Thurmond for president. With the Democrats badly divided, Republicans were confident that Republican nominee Thomas Dewey would win the election. Wallace himself predicted that Truman would be "the worst defeated candidate in history".

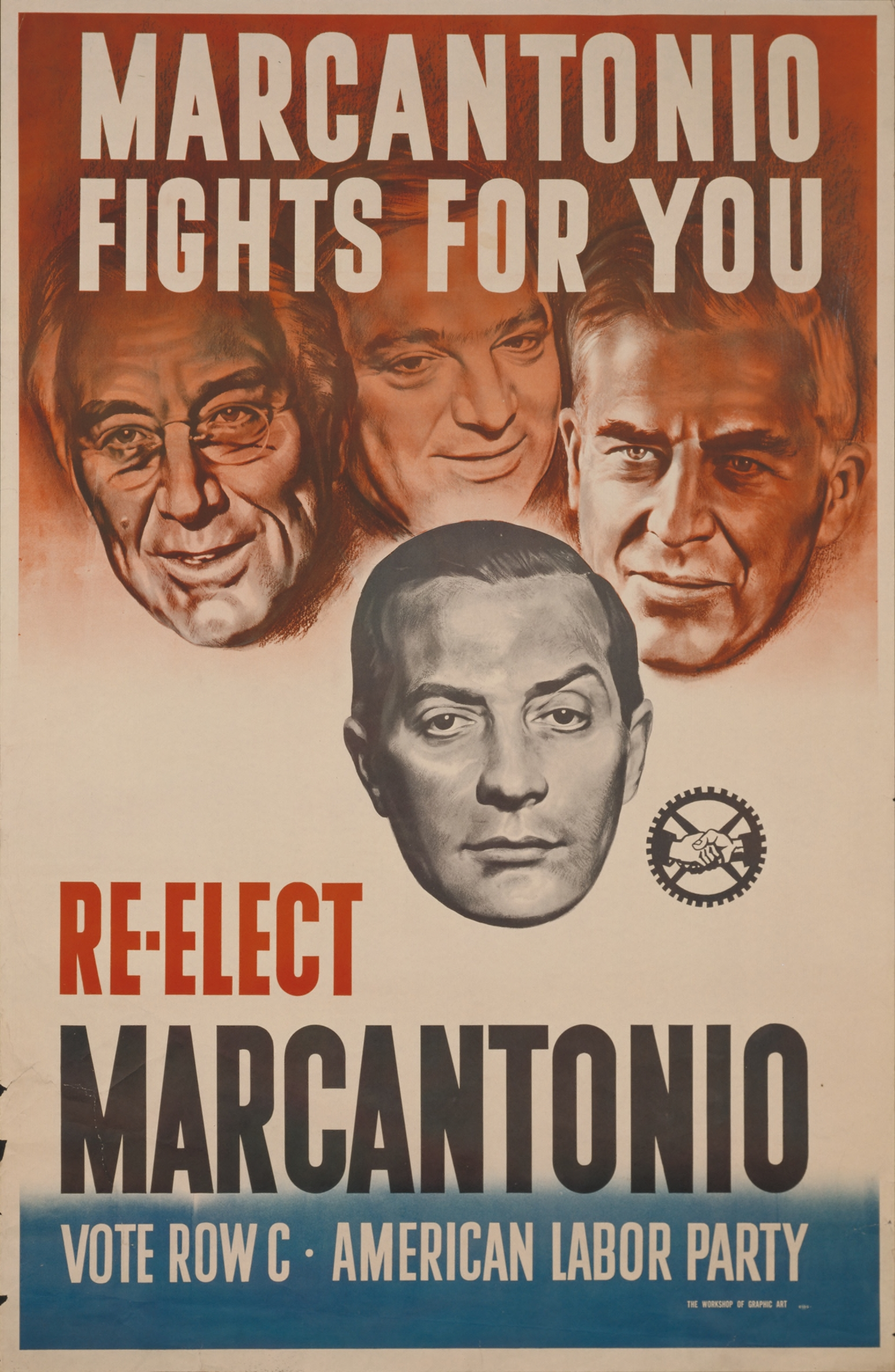
American Labor Party campaign poster featuring Vito Marcantonio as a candidate for reelection to Congress, 1948. Above him the faces of Franklin D. Roosevelt, Fiorello La Guardia, and Wallace look on.

Though polls consistently showed him losing the race, Truman ran an effective campaign against Dewey and the conservative 80th United States Congress. He ultimately defeated Dewey in both the popular and electoral vote. Wallace won just 2.38 percent of the nationwide popular vote and failed to carry any state. His best performance was in New York, where he won eight percent of the vote. Just one of the party's congressional candidates, incumbent Congressman Vito Marcantonio, won election. Wallace traveled over 55,000 miles during the campaign. Though Wallace and Thurmond probably took many voters from Truman, their presence in the race may have boosted the president's overall appeal by casting him as the candidate of the center-left. In response to the election results, Wallace stated, "Unless this bi-partisan foreign policy of high prices and war is promptly reversed, I predict that the Progressive Party will rapidly grow into the dominant party. ... To save the peace of the world the Progressive Party is more needed than ever before".

Historians Edward Schapsmeier and Frederick Schapsmeier argue:

The Progressive party stood for one thing and Wallace another. Actually the party organization was controlled from the outset by those representing the radical left and not liberalism per se. This made it extremely easy for Communists and fellow travelers to infiltrate into important positions within the party machinery. Once this happened, party stands began to resemble a party line. Campaign literature, speech materials, and campaign slogans sounded strangely like echoes of what Moscow wanted to hear. As if wearing moral blinkers, Wallace increasingly became an imperceptive ideologue. Words were uttered by Wallace that did not sound like him, and his performance took on a strange Jekyll and Hyde quality—one moment he was a peace protagonist and the next a propaganda parrot for the Kremlin.

== Later politics ==
Wallace initially remained active in politics following the 1948 campaign, and he delivered the keynote address at the 1950 Progressive National Convention. In early 1949, Wallace testified before Congress in the hope of preventing the ratification of the North Atlantic Treaty, which established the NATO alliance between the United States, Canada, and several European countries. He became increasingly critical of the Soviet Union after 1948, and he resigned from the Progressive Party in August 1950 due to his support for the UN intervention in the Korean War. After leaving the Progressive Party, Wallace endured what biographers John Culver and John Hyde describe as a "long, slow decline into obscurity marked by a certain acceptance of his outcast status".

In the early 1950s, he spent much of his time rebutting attacks by prominent public figures such as General Leslie Groves, who claimed to have stopped providing Wallace with information regarding the Manhattan Project because he considered Wallace to be a security risk. In 1951, Wallace appeared before Congress to deny accusations that in 1944 he had encouraged a coalition between Chiang Kai-shek and the Chinese Communists. In 1952, he published an article, "Where I Was Wrong", in which he repudiated his earlier foreign policy positions and declared the Soviet Union to be "utterly evil". Wallace did not endorse a candidate in the 1952 presidential election, but in the 1956 presidential election he endorsed incumbent Republican president Dwight D. Eisenhower over Democratic nominee Adlai Stevenson. Wallace, who maintained a correspondence with Eisenhower, described Eisenhower as "utterly sincere" in his efforts for peace. Wallace also began a correspondence with Vice President Richard Nixon, but he declined to endorse either Nixon or Democratic nominee John F. Kennedy in the 1960 presidential election. Though Wallace criticized Kennedy's farm policy during the 1960 campaign, Kennedy invited Wallace to his 1961 inauguration, the first presidential inauguration Wallace had attended since 1945. Wallace later wrote Kennedy, "at no time in our history have so many tens of millions of people been so completely enthusiastic about an inaugural address as about yours". In 1962, he delivered a speech commemorating the centennial of the establishment of the Department of Agriculture. He also began a correspondence with President Lyndon B. Johnson regarding methods to alleviate rural poverty, though privately he criticized Johnson's escalation of American involvement in the Vietnam War. In the 1964 election, Wallace returned to the Democratic fold, supporting Johnson over Republican nominee Barry Goldwater. Due to declining health, he made his last public appearance that year; in one of his last speeches, he stated, "We lost Cuba in 1959 not only because of Castro but also because we failed to understand the needs of the farmer in the back country of Cuba from 1920 onward. ... The common man is on the march, but it is up to the uncommon men of education and insight to lead that march constructively".

== Business success ==
Wallace continued to co-own and take an interest in the company he had established, Pioneer Hi-Bred (formerly the Hi-Bred Corn Company), and he established an experimental farm at his New York estate. He focused much of his efforts on the study of chickens, and Pioneer Hi-Bred's chickens at one point produced three-quarters of all commercially sold eggs worldwide. He also wrote or co-wrote several works on agriculture, including a book on the history of corn.

== Illness and death ==
Wallace was diagnosed with amyotrophic lateral sclerosis (ALS) in 1964, at the age of 76. He consulted numerous specialists and tried various methods of treating the disease, stating, "I look on myself as an ALS guinea-pig, willing to try almost anything". He died in Danbury, Connecticut, on November 18, 1965, at the age of 77. His remains were cremated and the ashes interred in Glendale Cemetery in Des Moines, Iowa.

== Family ==
In 1913, Wallace met Ilo Browne, the daughter of a successful businessman from Indianola, Iowa. Wallace and Browne married on May 20, 1914, and had three children. Henry Browne (b. 1915), Robert Browne (b. 1918), and Jean Browne (b. 1920). Wallace and his family lived in Des Moines until Wallace accepted appointment as secretary of agriculture, at which point they began living in an apartment at Wardman Park in Washington, D.C. In 1945, Wallace and his wife purchased a 115-acre farm near South Salem, New York, known as Farvue. Ilo was supportive of her husband's career and enjoyed serving as Second Lady of the United States from 1941 to 1945, though she was uncomfortable with many of Wallace's Progressive supporters during his 1948 presidential campaign. Wallace and Ilo remained married until his death in 1965; she lived until 1981. In 1999, Wallace's three children sold their shares in Pioneer Hi-Bred to DuPont for well over $1 billion. Wallace's grandson, Scott Wallace, won the Democratic nomination for Pennsylvania's 1st congressional district in the 2018 elections. He was defeated by Republican incumbent Brian Fitzpatrick in the general election.

== Religion ==
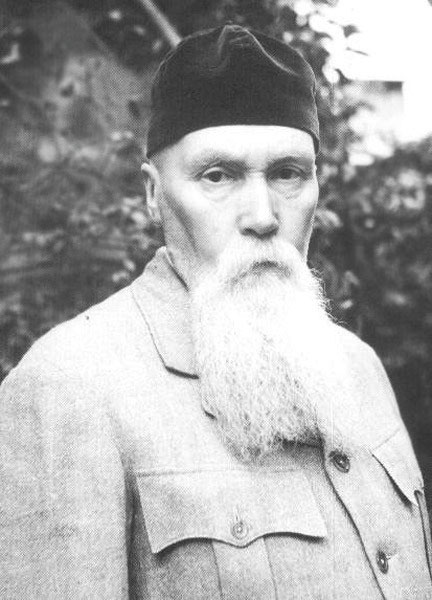
Wallace associated with controversial émigré Russian Theosophist Nicholas Roerich.

Wallace was raised a Calvinist but showed an interest in other religious teachings during his life. He was deeply interested in religion from a young age, reading works by authors like Ralph Waldo Emerson, Ralph Waldo Trine, and William James, whose The Varieties of Religious Experience had a particularly strong impact on Wallace. After his grandfather's death in 1916, he left the Presbyterian Church and became increasingly interested in mysticism. He later said, "I know I am often called a mystic, and in the years following my leaving the United Presbyterian Church I was probably a practical mystic… I'd say I was a mystic in the sense that George Washington Carver was—who believed God was in everything and therefore, if you went to God, you could find the answers". Wallace began regularly attending meetings of the pantheistic Theosophical Society, and, in 1925, he helped organize the Des Moines parish of the Liberal Catholic Church. Wallace left the Liberal Catholic Church in 1930 and joined the Episcopal Church, but he continued to be interested in various mystic groups and individuals.

Among those with whom Wallace corresponded were author George William Russell, astrologer L. Edward Johndro, and Charles Roos, who took on the persona of a Native American medicine man. In the early 1930s, Wallace began corresponding with Nicholas Roerich, a prominent Russian émigré, artist, peace activist, and Theosophist. With Wallace's support, Roerich was appointed to lead a federal expedition to the Gobi Desert to collect drought-resistant grasses. Roerich's expedition ended in a public fiasco, and Roerich fled to India after the Internal Revenue Service launched a tax investigation.

The letters that Wallace wrote to Roerich from 1933 to 1934 were eventually acquired by Republican newspaper publisher Paul Block. The Republicans threatened to reveal to the public what they characterized as Wallace's bizarre religious beliefs before the November 1940 elections but were deterred when the Democrats countered by threatening to release information about Republican candidate Wendell Willkie's rumored extramarital affair with the writer Irita Van Doren. The contents of the letters did become public seven years later, in the winter of 1947, when right-wing columnist Westbrook Pegler published what were purported to be extracts from them as evidence that Wallace was a "messianic fumbler", and "off-center mentally". During the 1948 campaign Pegler and other hostile reporters, including H. L. Mencken, aggressively confronted Wallace on the subject at a public meeting in Philadelphia in July. Wallace declined to comment, accusing the reporters of being Pegler's stooges. Many press outlets were critical of Wallace's association with Roerich; one newspaper mockingly wrote that if Wallace became president "we shall get in tune with the Infinite, vibrate in the correct plane, outstare the Evil Eye, reform the witches, overcome all malicious spells and ascend the high road to health and happiness".

Henry Wallace reportedly dabbled in Zoroastrianism and Buddhism.

== Legacy ==
During his time in the Roosevelt administration, Wallace became a controversial figure, attracting a mix of praise and criticism for various actions. He remains a controversial figure in the 21st century. Historian Arthur M. Schlesinger Jr. pronounced Wallace to be both "an incorrigibly naive politician" and "the best secretary of agriculture the country has ever had". Journalist Peter Beinart writes that Wallace's "naive faith in U.S.-Soviet cooperation" damaged his legacy. Historian Andrew Seal lauds Wallace for his focus on combating both economic and racial inequality. Wallace's vision of the "Century of the Common Man", which denied American exceptionalism in foreign policy, continues to influence the foreign policy of individuals like Bernie Sanders. In 2013, historian Thomas W. Devine wrote that "newly available Soviet sources do confirm Wallace's position that Moscow's behavior was not as relentlessly aggressive as many believed at the time". Yet Devine also writes that "enough new information has come to light to cast serious doubt both on Wallace's benign attitude toward Stalin's intentions and on his dark, conspiratorial view of the Truman administration".

Alex Ross of The New Yorker writes, "with the exception of Al Gore, Wallace remains the most famous almost-president in American history". Journalist Jeff Greenfield writes that the 1944 Democratic National Convention was one of the most important political events of the twentieth century, since the leading contenders for the nomination might have governed in vastly different ways. In The Untold History of the United States, Oliver Stone argues that, had Wallace become president in 1945, "there might have been no atomic bombings, no nuclear arms race, and no Cold War". By contrast, Ron Capshaw of the conservative National Review argues that a President Wallace would have practiced a policy of appeasement that would have allowed the spread of Communism into countries like Iran, Greece, and Italy.

The Henry A. Wallace Beltsville Agricultural Research Center in Beltsville, Maryland, the largest agricultural research complex in the world, is named for him. Wallace founded the Wallace Genetic Foundation to support agricultural research. His son, Robert, founded the Wallace Global Fund to support sustainable development. A speech Wallace delivered in 1942 inspired Aaron Copland to compose Fanfare for the Common Man. The Franklin D. Roosevelt Presidential Library and Museum's grounds in Hyde Park, New York, include the Henry A. Wallace Visitor and Education Center at its north end.

== Books ==
- Agricultural Prices (1920)
- Corn and Corn-Growing with E. N. Bressman (1923)
- When to feed corn, when to sell it (1923)
- Correlation and machine calculation with George W. Snedecor (1925)
- New administration and farm relief (1933)
- America must choose (1934)
- Charted course toward stable prosperity (1934)
- New frontiers (1934)
- Research and adjustment march together (1934)
- Statesmanship and religion (1934)
- Working together in the corn-hog program (1934)
- Cooperation: the dominant economic idea of the future (1936)
- Whose Constitution? An inquiry into the general welfare (1936)
- Technology, corporations, and the general welfare (1937)
- Paths to plenty (1938)
- American choice (1940)
- Price of freedom (1940)
  - Preço da liberdade (1942)
- Pan American friendship (1941)
- ¿Que hara Norteamérica? (1941)
- Después de la guerra debe comenzar el siglo del hombre del pueblo (1942)
- Price of free world victory (1942)
  - Precio de la victoria (1942)
- Why did God make America? (1942)
- America's part in world reconstruction (1943)
- Century of the Common Man (1943)
  - Century of the common man (UK) (1944)
- Christian bases of world order (1943)
- Discursos pronunciados en Lima (1943)
- Ideales comunes (1943)
- New world theme: The price of free world victory (1943)
- Democracy first: What we fight for (1944)
- Our job in the Pacific (1944)
- Sixty million jobs (1945)
  - Arbeit für sechzig Millionen Menschen (1946)
  - Ocupación para sesenta millones (1946)
  - Lavoro per tutti (1946)
  - Hua-lai-shih ti hu shêng (1947)
- Era del popolo (1946)
- Fight for peace (1946)
- Soviet Asia mission Andrew J. Steiger (1946)
  - Ma mission en Asie soviétique (1947)
  - Sondermission in Sowjet-Asien und China (1947)
  - Misiya v Savetska Aziya (1948)
- Toward world peace (1948)
  - Naar wereldvrede (1948)
  - Vers la paix (1948)

== Bibliography ==
=== Books ===
- Agricultural Prices (1920)
- When to Feed Corn, When to Sell It (1923)
- New Administration and Farm Relief (1933)
- Charted Course Toward Stable Prosperity
- New Frontiers (1934)
- America Must Choose (1934)
- Statesmanship and Religion (1934)
- Whose Constitution? An Inquiry Into the General Welfare (1936)
- Corn and Growing Corn (1937), with Earl N. Bressman.
- The Century of the Common Man (1943) Illustrations by Hugo Gellert. Foreword by Carl Sandburg.

Hugo Gellert created a series of twenty silk screen prints to be used as artwork. The original prints are now in the digital collection at the Whitney Museum of American Art.

- Democracy Reborn (1944)
- Sixty Million Jobs (1945)
- Soviet Asia Mission (1946)
- Toward World Peace (1948)
- Where I Was Wrong (1952)
- The Price of Vision: The Diary of Henry A. Wallace 1942–1946 (1973), edited by John Morton Blum.

=== Articles and essays ===
- "Correlation and Machine Calculation." with George W. Snedecor. Iowa State College of Agriculture and Mechanic Arts. Official Publication, Vol. 23, No. 35, January 28, 1925.
- "American Agriculture and World Markets." Foreign Affairs, Vol. 12, No. 2, January 1934 pp. pp. 216–230. doi:10.2307/20030579. JSTOR 20030579.
- "The World Cotton Drama." Foreign Affairs, Vol. 13, No. 4, July 1935, pp. 543–556. doi:10.2307/20020214. JSTOR 20020214.

=== Pamphlets ===
- Cooperation: The Dominant Economic Idea of the Future. New York: Cooperative League (1936). OCLC 25488777. 16 p.

Book contributions

- Foreword to A Pasture Handbook. U.S. Department of Agriculture (April 1934).
- Introduction to Brant, Irving. Storm Over the Constitution: Democracy Turns to Federalism, by Irving Brant. Bobbs-Merrill (1936).
- Foreword to America's "Thought Police": Record of the Un-American Activities Commission. Civil Rights Congress (October 1947).

Published addresses

- Agricultural Price Outlook (1923).

An address to the 28th annual meeting of the Illinois Farmers' Institute in Belleville, Illinois, on February 21, 1923. Published by the Illinois Farmers' Institute.

- Working Together in the Corn-hog Program (1934)

"Remarks by Hon. H.A. Wallace, Secretary of Agriculture, delivered in the Department of Agriculture period of the National Farm and Home Hour, broadcast by 50 associate N.B.C. radio stations, Thursday, May 10, 1934."

- The Dairyman's Place in Farm Solidarity (1937)

"Adapted in the Division of Information from an address by Henry A. Wallace, Secretary of Agriculture, before the annual meeting of the National Cooperative Milk Producers' Federation at Baltimore, Md., November 2, 1931."

- Technology, Corporations, and the General Welfare (1937)

Speech delivered on June 24, 1937. Published by the University of North Carolina Press.

- An American Income for Cotton (1938)

"Adapted from an address by Henry A. Wallace, Secretary of Agriculture, before a meeting of farmers, A.A.A. committeemen, and others, at Fort Worth, Texas, September 30, 1938."

- An American Income for Wheat (1938)
- The Century of the Common Man (1942)

"A speech delivered May 8, 1942 articulating the goals of the war for the allies."

- The Price of Free World Victory (1942)

"An address delivered May 8, 1942 to the members and guests of the Free World Association at a dinner at the Hotel Commodore in New York. Published in collaboration with the Free World Movement."

- The Century of the Common Man (1942)

A speech delivered November 8, 1942, at the Congress of American-Soviet Friendship Mass Meeting in New York. He further expanded on the subject since his delivery of a similar speech earlier that year.

- America Tomorrow (1943)

An address delivered July 25, 1943, at the Mass Meeting of Labor and Civic Organizations in Detroit, Michigan.

== See also ==
- History of left-wing politics in the United States
- Honeydew (melon), apparently first introduced to China by H. A. Wallace and still known there as the "Wallace melon"
- Bailan melon, one of the most famous Chinese melon cultivars, bred from the "Wallace melon"

== Works cited ==
- Culver, John C.; Hyde, John (2000). American Dreamer: A Life of Henry A. Wallace. W. W. Norton. ISBN 0-393-04645-1.
- Devine, Thomas W. (2013). Henry Wallace's 1948 Presidential Campaign and the Future of Postwar Liberalism. University of North Carolina Press. ISBN 978-1469602035.; online review
- Donovan, Robert J. (1977). Conflict and Crisis: the Presidency of Harry S. Truman, 1945–1948. University of Missouri Press. ISBN 978-0393056365.
- Karabell, Zachary (2007). The Last Campaign: How Harry Truman Won the 1948 Election. Knopf Doubleday. ISBN 9780307428868.
- Kennedy, David M. (1999). Freedom from Fear: The American People in Depression and War, 1929–1945. Oxford University Press. ISBN 978-0195038347.
- Malsberger, John William (2000). From Obstruction to Moderation: The Transformation of Senate Conservatism, 1938–1952. Susquehanna University Press. ISBN 978-1575910260.
- Nichols, John (2020). The Fight for the Soul of the Democratic Party: The Enduring Legacy of Henry Wallace's Anti-Fascist, Anti-Racist Politics. Verso Books. ISBN 978-1788737401.
- Patterson, James T. (1996). Grand Expectations: The United States, 1945–1974. Oxford University Press. ISBN 9780199743957.
- Schapsmeier, Edward L.; Schapsmeier, Frederick H. (1968). Henry A. Wallace in Iowa: The Agrarian Years, 1910–1940. Iowa University Press. ISBN 978-0813817415.
- Schapsmeier, Edward L.; Schapsmeier, Frederick H. (1970). Prophet in Politics: Henry A. Wallace and the War Years, 1940–1965. Iowa University Press. ISBN 9780813812953.
- Schmidt, Karl (1960). Henry A. Wallace: Quixotic Crusade 1948. Syracuse University Press.

Political offices
Preceded by Arthur M. Hyde	United States Secretary of Agriculture; 1933–1940	Succeeded by Claude R. Wickard
Preceded by John Nance Garner	Vice President of the United States; 1941–1945	Succeeded by Harry S. Truman
Preceded by Jesse H. Jones	United States Secretary of Commerce; 1945–1946	Succeeded by W. Averell Harriman
Party political offices
Preceded by John Nance Garner	Democratic nominee for Vice President of the United States; 1940	Succeeded by Harry S. Truman
New political party	Progressive nominee for President of the United States; 1948	Succeeded by Vincent Hallinan
Preceded by Franklin D. Roosevelt	American Labor nominee for President of the United States; Endorsed; 1948	Succeeded by Vincent Hallinan
