= Donald Nelson =

American business executive and public servant (1888–1959)

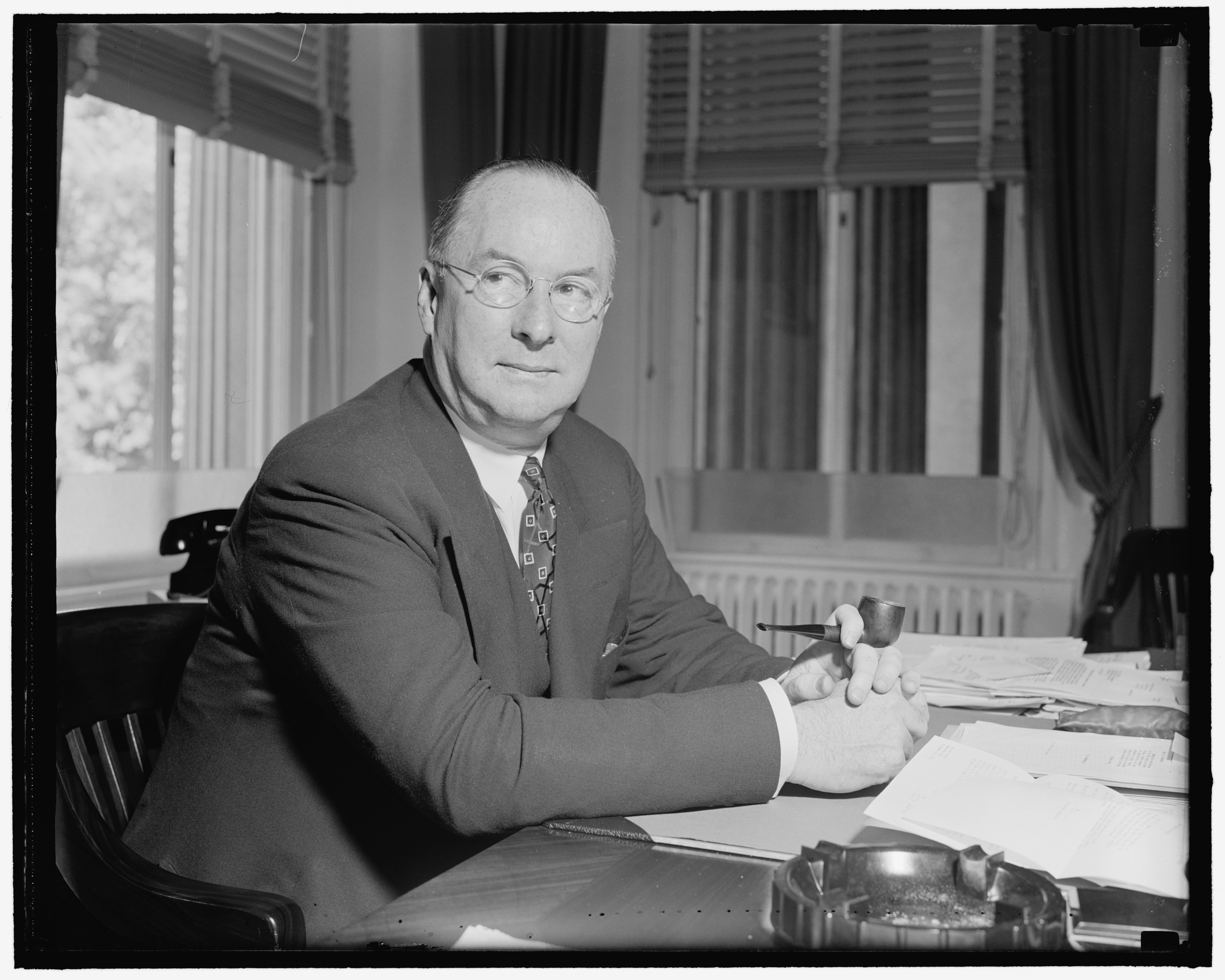
Donald M. Nelson in 1940

Donald Marr Nelson (1888–1959) was an American business executive and public servant, serving as the executive vice president of Sears Roebuck before accepting the position of director of priorities of the United States Office of Production Management (1941–1942). In 1942 Nelson became chairman of the War Production Board (1942–1944) when it replaced the OPM. He later served for two years (1945–1947) as president of the Society of Independent Motion Picture Producers.

== Life and career ==
Nelson was born in Hannibal, Missouri, the son of a locomotive engineer. He went to the University of Missouri, graduating in 1911 with a degree in chemical engineering. In 1912 he took a job as a chemist with Sears, Roebuck and Company. There he steadily advanced, becoming vice-president in 1930 and being named executive vice president and vice chairman of the executive committee by 1939.

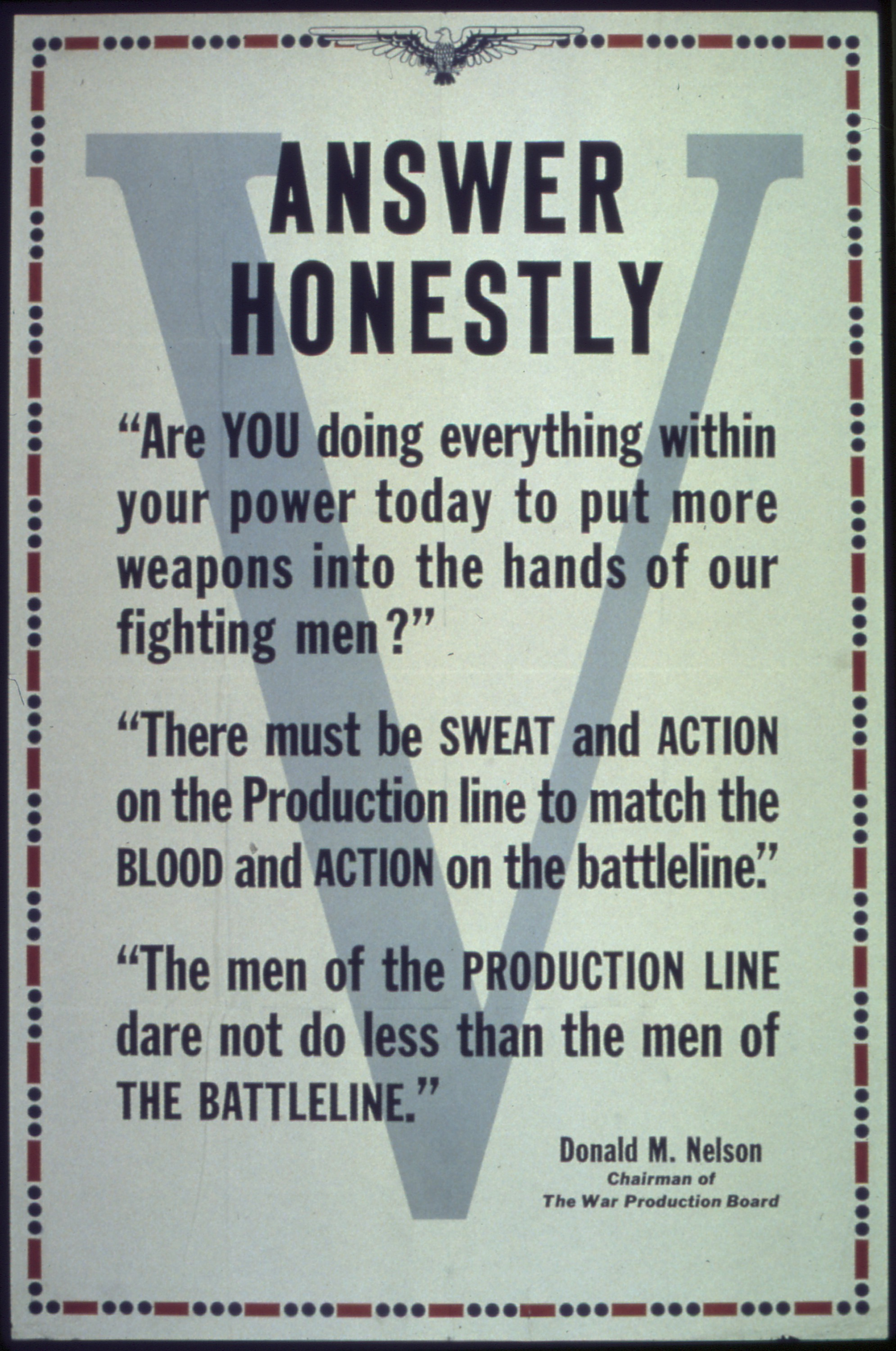
Quote from Donald M. Nelson

It was Nelson's experience at Sears, buying more than 135,000 different products while gaining an unparalleled knowledge of American industry, that led President Franklin Roosevelt to give him several jobs overseeing production of war material for the United States and its allies in World War II. In May 1940, Roosevelt appointed Nelson to a post at the Treasury Department where he served as acting director of the procurement division, managing sales of raw materials to Britain and its allies for use in their fight against the Axis.

During the second half of 1940, Axis successes and the possibility of American involvement in the spreading war heightened concerns about the nation's military readiness. With an eye to improving the efficiency of war production, in January, 1941 several agencies responsible for purchasing billions of dollars of war materials for the defense industry were reorganized into a central procurement agency, the Office of Production Management, with Nelson the director of priorities. As American war preparations continued to expand during 1941, new inefficiencies in the supply process were exposed, and in July a new agency, the Supply Priorities and Allocations Board (SPAB) was created to deal with them. Nelson was named its director.

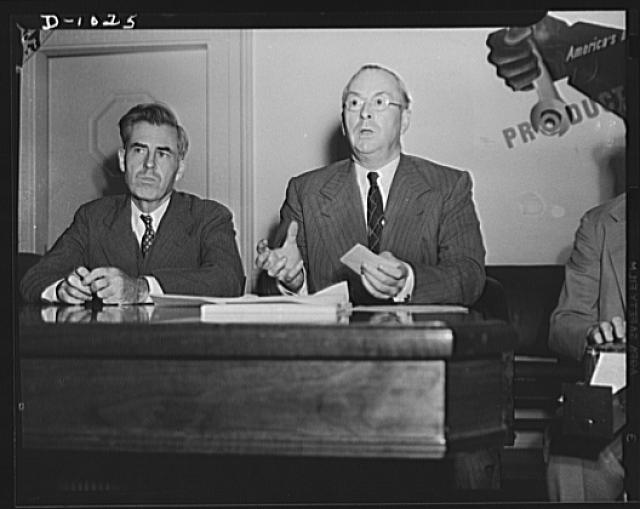
Henry A. Wallace, Chairman, and Donald M. Nelson, Executive Director, of SPAB after its first meeting

In January, 1942, following America's entry into the war after the attack on Pearl Harbor, Roosevelt abolished both the OPM and the SPAB, replacing them with a new agency, the War Production Board. Once again, FDR asked Nelson to lead it.

Nelson proved a poor leader who feuded with the Army and failed to make timely decisions. Nelson faced extensive criticism from the military during his tenure. Described by historian Doris Kearns Goodwin as "habitually indecisive", Nelson had difficulty sorting the conflicting requests from various agencies. Secretary of War Henry L. Stimson regularly criticized Nelson for his "inability to take charge". He argued endlessly with Robert P. Patterson of the War Department. Patterson typically demanded that civilian needs be given lower priority because military supplies were essential to winning the war, and that argument usually prevailed.

In February 1943, Roosevelt invited Bernard Baruch to replace Nelson as WPB head, but was persuaded to change his mind by advisor Harry Hopkins, and Nelson remained in the post. He was replaced by Julius Albert Krug, who served from August 1944 until the Board was dissolved in November 1945.

Nelson returned to private industry. He died of a stroke in 1959. His 1946 memoir Arsenal of Democracy is one of the major works on the U.S. industrial mobilization effort during World War II.
