= Supply Priorities and Allocations Board =

World War II United States administrative entity

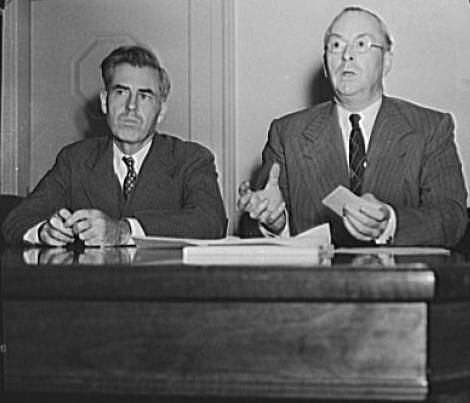
- Chairman Henry A. Wallace and executive director Donald M. Nelson following the SPAB's first meeting (September 2, 1941)

Agency overview
- Formed: August 28, 1941
- Dissolved: January 1942
- Superseding agency: War Production Board
- Jurisdiction: United States Government
- Headquarters: Washington, D.C.
- Agency executive: Donald M. Nelson, Executive Director
- Parent agency: Office for Emergency Management

The Supply Priorities and Allocations Board (SPAB) was a United States administrative entity within the Office for Emergency Management which was created and dissolved during World War II. The board was created by President Franklin D. Roosevelt via Executive Order 8875 on August 28, 1941, and dissolved less than five months later. The purpose of the Supply Priorities and Allocations Board was to coordinate the distribution of materials and commodities related to national defense and to assist the Office of Production Management (OPM) in carrying out their overlapping duties. The board's membership consisted of the director general (William S. Knudsen) and associate director general (Sidney Hillman) of the OPM, Secretary of War Henry L. Stimson, Secretary of the Navy Frank Knox, administrator of the Office of Price Administration Leon Henderson, chairman of the Economic Defense Board Henry A. Wallace (who was also the vice president of the United States) and the special assistant to the president supervising the Lend-Lease program, Edward Stettinius, Jr. The president retained the power to appoint an executive director and to select the chairman of the board from its members. The only chairman of SPAB during its short lifespan was Vice President Wallace and its sole executive director was businessman Donald M. Nelson.

The board's duties were essentially to determine how to best allocate the resources of the United States among the American public, allied militaries and the United States military which, at the time of SPAB's creation, had not yet entered the war. Critics complained that the board's membership created several conflicts in the chain of command. For example, Henderson was inferior to Knudsen as the director of a subdivision of the OPM but was his equal as a fellow board member of SPAB. Regardless, SPAB was successful in increasing military aid to the Soviet Union, consistent with President Roosevelt's stated policy on Russia, despite strong opposition from the Office of Production Management and others.

Less than four months after SPAB was created, the United States formally entered the World War II when it declared war upon Japan on December 8, 1941. SPAB seemed poised to dramatically increase in importance. However, this increased significance was short-lived; on January 16, 1942, President Roosevelt issued Executive Order 9024, establishing the War Production Board (WPB). The War Production Board superseded the Supply Priorities and Allocations Board and the Office of Production Management and absorbed both boards' duties. Donald M. Nelson, former executive director of SPAB, became the first chairman of the WPB.
