= Washington Steel Corporation =

Washington Steel Corporation was a highly successful post-war stainless steel production company, located in Washington, Pennsylvania. Washington Steel was the first U.S. company to use a Sendzimir Mill, invented by Polish inventor Tadeusz Sendzimir to cold-roll stainless steel.

Washington Steel was founded in 1945 by T. S. Fitch who was a member of the U.S. War Production Board from 1942 to 1944. As a member of the Board's Steel Division, he saw a Sendzimir Cold Rolling Mill in operation, and began to appreciate its potential value for rolling stainless steel into thin, high-accuracy sheets.

Washington Steel began production in 1947, with a 39-inch Z-mill much wider than any previously produced (it cost $278,000, installed). It operated two Sendzimir mills, which were equipped with Pratt and Whitney flying micrometers, capable of rolling 36-inch and 48-inch wide stainless sheet. The light-gauge stainless steel had exceptional dimensional accuracy and surface quality, and in its first year of operation the company posted net income of $237,000. Sales in 1948 were $4.6 million, and by 1954, more than quadrupled to $19 million.

The company's ability to achieve dimensional precision in strong, light-gauge steel quickly won favor in the aerospace industry, and was used in the Atlas missile, which served as the launch vehicle for NASA's Project Mercury. This sent John Glenn, the first American into earth orbit in 1962. Washington Steel supplied Atlas missile with AISI grade 301, a special cold-rolled austenitic steel.

The company was listed on the New York Stock Exchange under the symbol WSS on Feb 7, 1968, and remained there until its purchase by Blount, Inc. in 1979.

Washington Steel was purchased by Lukens Steel Company in April 1992 for $274 million. In 1998, Bethlehem Steel Corp. acquired Lukens Steel and this included Washington Steel.

In 1999, Bethlehem Steel, the owner of Lukens Steel at the time, declared bankruptcy and sold off the Houston and Massillon mills to Allegheny Teledyne. The remaining mills from the Washington Steel acquisition were closed, citing strong competition in the stainless steel market as the cause. Allegheny used the assets of the Washington steel Division to improve its finishing capacity for sheet and strip.
