= Board of Economic Warfare =

The Office of Administrator of Export Control (also referred to as the Export Control Administration) was established in the United States by Presidential Proclamation 2413, July 2, 1940, to administer export licensing provisions of the act of July 2, 1940 (54 Stat. 714). Brigadier General Russell Lamont Maxwell, United States Army, headed up this military entity. It was abolished by Presidential Executive Order 8900, September 15, 1941, and its functions were transferred to the Economic Defense Board, which had been established by Presidential Executive Order 8839, July 30, 1941, to develop policies and programs to strengthen U.S. international economic relations. The name was changed to Board of Economic Warfare by Presidential Executive Order 8982, December 17, 1941. In turn, it was abolished by Executive Order 9361, July 15, 1943, and the functions were transferred to the newly created Office of Economic Warfare, OEM, which also assumed control of U.S. Commercial Company, Rubber Development Corporation, Petroleum Reserves Corporation, and Export-Import Bank of Washington from the Reconstruction Finance Corporation. Consolidated into the Foreign Economic Administration, 1943.

== Henry A. Wallace ==
Vice President Henry A. Wallace chaired the Economic Defense Board, the Supply Priorities and Allocations Board, and the Board of Economic Warfare as a member of President Roosevelt's secret "war cabinet".

Divided into an Office of Imports, Office of Exports, and Office of War Analysis, the Board of Economic Warfare (BEW) supported the Allied war effort through procurement of strategic resources. As chairman, Wallace freed himself to deal with long-term policy matters by delegating the day-to-day management of the BEW to Milo Perkins, an associate from the Department of Agriculture. Like many special boards created by President Roosevelt, the BEW came in for its share of interdepartmental bickering, rivalries, and conflicts of authority.

When Roosevelt signed an executive order in April 1942 allowing the BEW to negotiate contracts with foreign governments, Secretary of State Cordell Hull saw it as an attempt to create a second State Department. Wallace was convinced that the Latin American rubber supply could be increased if living standards of that region's rubber workers were raised to reduce the incidence of chronic malnutrition and malaria. He attempted to force negotiated contracts to provide for improvements to the Latin American infrastructure, with the United States funding half the cost of these programs. Wallace's acquisition of executive authority had been unpopular with the rank and file in Congress, and most members supported Hull, a former senator, in his attacks on the BEW and its chairman.

The BEW controversy climaxed in February 1943, when Wallace tried to place the purchasing authority of the Reconstruction Finance Corporation (RFC) under the BEW's jurisdiction. Commerce Secretary Jesse Jones denounced Wallace's action. When Wallace retaliated by accusing Jones of delaying shipments of quinine to Marines dying of malaria, the imbroglio became too hot for Roosevelt to ignore. The embattled vice president wrote to the president, asking for either complete vindication for his actions in the matter or relief of his duties as chairman of the BEW. Roosevelt responded on July 15, 1943, by dissolving the BEW and reconstituting its function under a new Foreign Economic Administration, headed by Leo Crowley, a known supporter of Jones.
