= William S. Knudsen =

American automotive industry executive (1879–1948)

William Knudsen
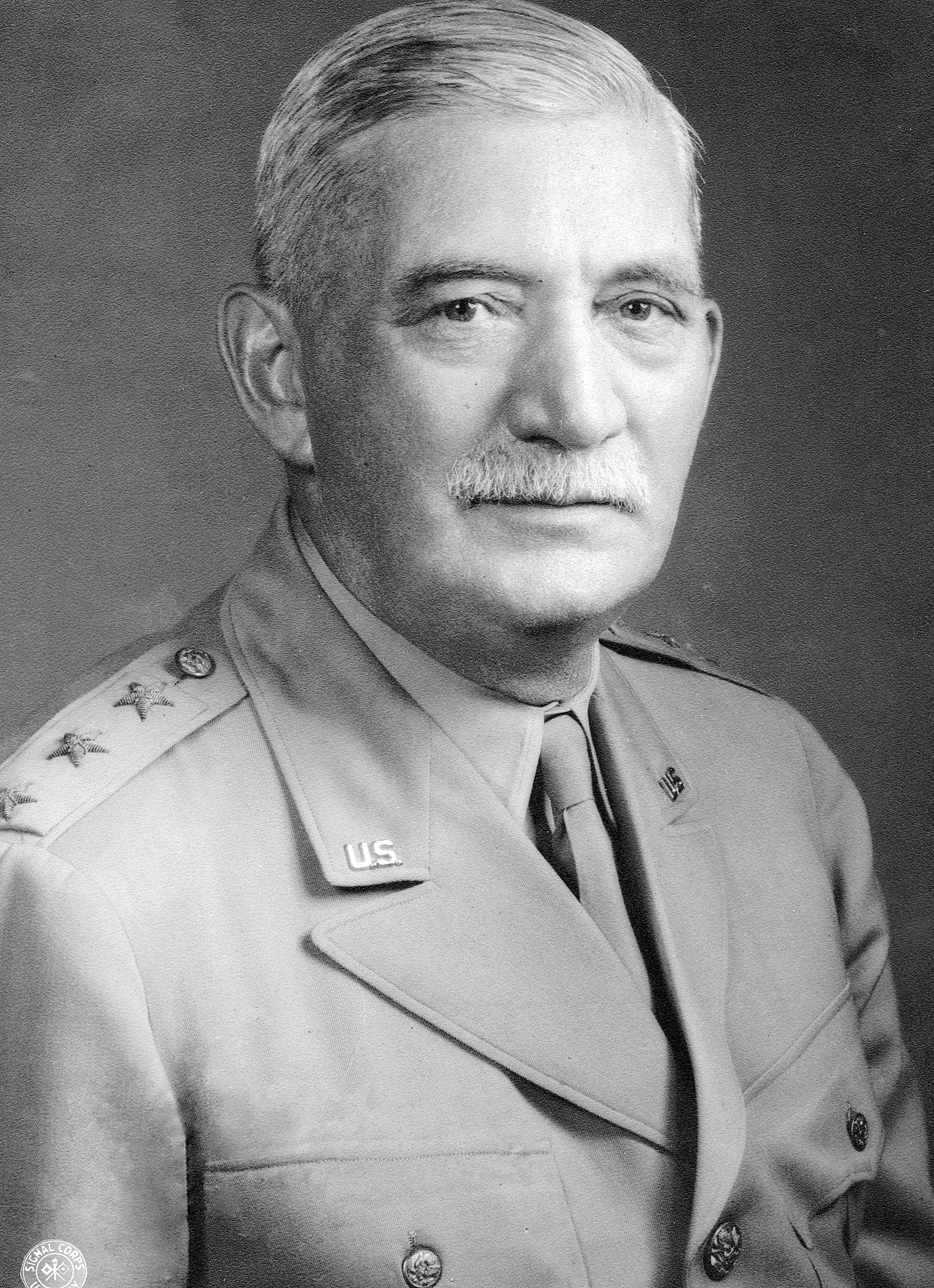
- Born: Signius Wilhelm Poul Knudsen; March 25, 1879; Copenhagen, Denmark
- Died: April 27, 1948 (aged 69); Detroit, Michigan, United States
- Spouse: Clara Euler (m. 1911)
- Children: 4, including Semon Knudsen
- Military career
- Allegiance: United States
- Branch: United States Army
- Service years: 1942–1945
- Rank: Lieutenant General
- Commands: Director of War Production; Air Technical Service Command
- Conflicts: World War II
- Awards: Army Distinguished Service Medal (2), American Campaign Medal; World War Two Victory Medal

William Signius Knudsen (born Signius Wilhelm Poul Knudsen; March 25, 1879 – April 27, 1948) was a Danish-American automotive industry executive and an American general during World War II.

His experience and success as a key senior manager in the operations sides of Ford Motor Company and then General Motors led the Franklin Roosevelt administration to commission him directly as a lieutenant general in the United States Army to help lead the United States' war materiel production efforts for World War II.

Knudsen became the only civilian in U.S. history to join the Army at such a high initial rank, and under his direction, American industry dramatically increased its military production, including growing aircraft production from fewer than 3,000 planes in 1939 to over 300,000 by war's end.

== Background ==
Knudsen was born in Copenhagen to customs officer Knud Peter Knudsen (1837–1908) and his second wife Augusta Pouline Regine Zøllner (1853–1934). He grew up in his childhood home on Voldmestergade 26 in the Kartoffelrækkerne neighborhood with five siblings and six half-siblings. He attended Øster Farimagsgade School and through his half-brother, the teenaged Knudsen got an apprenticeship at a bicycle shop, where he reportedly assembled the first tandem bicycle in Denmark.

Knudsen immigrated to the United States and arrived in New York in February 1900. While employed for a Harlem River shipyard, the foreman wrote down his name as "William S. Knudsen", or "Bill" for short, as the foreman "couldn't be bothered writing down all those initials".

== Career ==
Knudsen was working for the John R. Keim Company of Buffalo, New York, a bicycle and auto parts maker, when the Ford Motor Company bought it in 1911 for its steel-stamping experience and tooling.

Knudsen worked for Ford from 1911 to 1921, a decade that saw the formative development of the modern assembly line and true mass production. Working first for the Ford Motor Company and later for General Motors from 1921, Knudsen became an expert on mass production and a skilled manager. At Ford, Knudsen served as production manager of the Highland Park Plant in Michigan.

Knudsen was president of the Chevrolet Division of General Motors from 1924 to 1937 and was president of General Motors from 1937 to 1940. Under his leadership at Chevrolet, the division generated the greatest revenue of any GM division.

=== World War II service ===
In 1940, US President Franklin Roosevelt, at the recommendation of Bernard Baruch, asked Knudsen to come to Washington to help with war production. Knudsen was appointed as Chairman of the Office of Production Management and member of the National Defense Advisory Commission for which he received a salary of $1 per year.

In January 1942, Knudsen received a commission as a lieutenant general in the U.S. Army, the only civilian ever to join the army at such a high initial rank, and appointed as Director of Production, Office of the Under Secretary of War. In that capacity, he worked as a consultant and a troubleshooter for the War Department.

In both positions, Knudsen used his extensive experience in manufacturing and industry respect to facilitate the largest production job in history. In response to the demand for war materiel, production of machine tools tripled. The total aircraft produced for the U.S. military in 1939 was fewer than 3,000 planes. By the end of the war, America produced over 300,000 planes of which the Boeing B-29 Superfortress benefited greatly from Knudsen's direction. Production of both cargo and Navy ships also increased astronomically. Knudsen's influence not only smoothed government procurement procedures but also led companies that had never produced military hardware to enter the market. America outproduced its enemies. As Knudsen said, "We won because we smothered the enemy in an avalanche of production, the like of which he had never seen, nor dreamed possible."

He was appointed Director of the Air Technical Service Command when it was founded in July 1944 at Patterson Field, Ohio. He served in the Army until his resignation on June 1, 1945.

== Personal life ==
On November 1, 1911, Knudsen married Clara Elisabeth Euler in Buffalo. They had three daughters, Clara, Martha, and Elna, and one son, Semon "Bunkie" Knudsen, who also became a prominent automobile industry executive.

Knudsen was featured on the cover of Time magazine's October 7, 1940 issue. He was a member of Epiphany Lutheran Church (Lutheran Church–Missouri Synod) in Detroit and contributed greatly to the synod's projects around the Detroit area, including buildings for Epiphany Lutheran Church, Outer Drive Faith Lutheran Church, and the Evangelical Lutheran Institute for the Deaf.

== Honors and awards ==
Knudsen was awarded the Vermilye Medal by the Franklin Institute in 1941.

He was also appointed a Knight of the Order of the Dannebrog by the Kingdom of Denmark in 1930 and was promoted Grand Cross of the Order of the Dannebrog in 1946.

Knudsen was inducted into the Automotive Hall of Fame in 1968.

His daughter started a scholarship in the name of her parents.

Knudsen was awarded the Distinguished Service Medal in 1944 and again in 1945 for his service in the US Army during World War II. He also received the American Campaign Medal and World War II Victory Medal for his wartime service.

Distinguished Service Medal with oak leaf cluster	American Campaign Medal	World War II Victory Medal

== Dates of rank ==
Lieutenant General, Regular Army: January 28, 1942

Business positions
Preceded by Alfred P. Sloan Jr.	President of General Motors; 1937-1940	Succeeded by Charles E. Wilson
