= T. S. Fitch =

Founder of Washington Steel

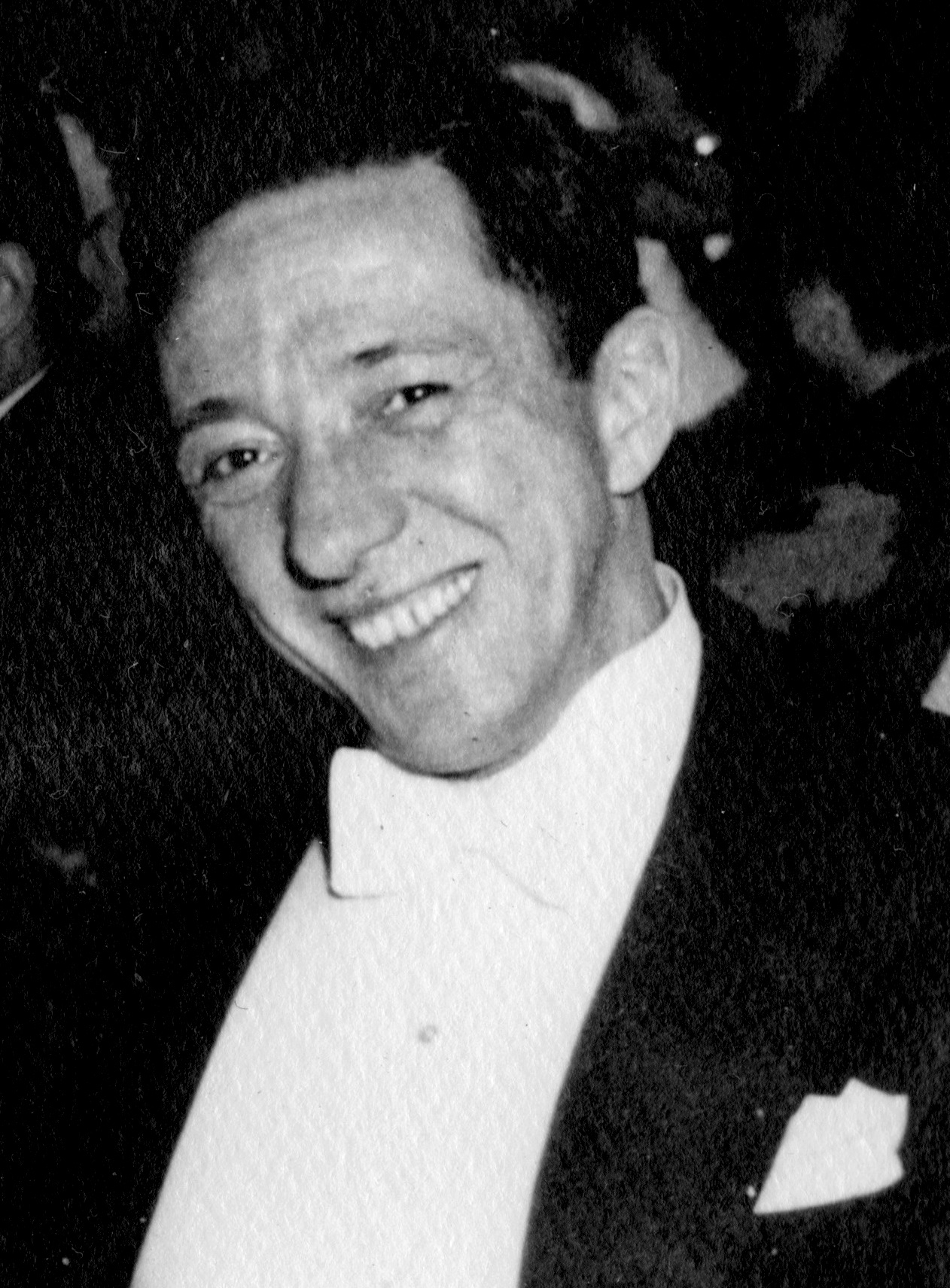
Tecumseh Sherman Fitch

Tecumseh Sherman Fitch (21 March 1908 – 7 October 1969) was the founder and CEO of Washington Steel Corporation. He was the great-grandson of Civil War general William Tecumseh Sherman. He graduated from Yale University in 1931, when he joined Jessop Steel, initially working as a laborer and then rising in the ranks of management to head the Composite Steel Division from 1936 to 1942. He founded Washington Steel in 1945.

Fitch served as mayor of Washington, Pennsylvania from 1956 to 1960. He was a strong supporter of the African-American community in that city, and was instrumental in the creation of the LeMoyne Center athletic facility in 1956, in the heart of the black community, where the T.S. Fitch Gymnasium was named for him. The dedication was attended by baseball greats Jackie Robinson and Branch Rickey Fitch was also a founding Board Member and strong supporter of PONY League Baseball, which was founded in Washington, PA in 1951.

Fitch married Janet M Reed in 1935, and they had seven children. He died of emphysema at the age of 61, in 1969.
