= War Production Board =

World War II US government agency

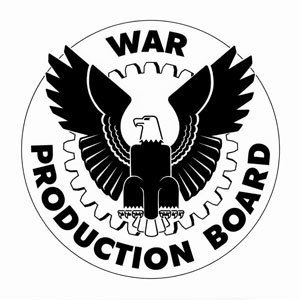

Agency overview
- Formed: January 1942
- Preceding agency: Supply Priorities and Allocations Board
- Dissolved: November 3, 1945
- Superseding agency: Civilian Production Board
- Jurisdiction: United States Government
- Headquarters: Washington, D.C.
- Agency executives: Donald M. Nelson, 1942–1944; Julius A. Krug, 1944–1945

The War Production Board (WPB) was an agency of the United States government that supervised war production during World War II. President Franklin D. Roosevelt established it in January 1942, with Executive Order 9024. The WPB replaced the Supply Priorities and Allocations Board and the Office of Production Management.

The WPB directed conversion of companies engaged in activities relevant to war from peacetime work to war needs, allocated scarce materials, established priorities in the distribution of materials and services, and prohibited nonessential production. It rationed such commodities as gasoline, heating oil, metals, rubber, paper, and plastics. It was dissolved almost exactly two months after the defeat of Japan in 1945 and was replaced by the Civilian Production Administration in late 1945.

In 1942–1945, WPB supervised the production of $183 billion (equivalent to $2.52 trillion in 2024) worth of weapons and supplies, about 40 percent of the world output of munitions. The UK, the USSR, and other allies produced an additional 30 percent, while the Axis produced only 30 percent. One fourth of the US output was warplanes; one fourth was warships. Meanwhile, the civilian standard of living was about level.

== Organization ==
The first chair of the board was Donald Nelson, who served from 1942 to 1944. He was succeeded by Julius Albert Krug, who served from 1944 until the board was dissolved.

The national WPB constituted the chair, the Secretaries of War, Navy, and Agriculture, the lieutenant general in charge of War Department procurement, the director of the Office of Price Administration, the Federal Loan Administrator, the chair of the Board of Economic Warfare, and the special assistant to the President for the defense aid program. The WPB had advisory, policy-making, and progress-reporting divisions.

The WPB employed mathematicians who were responsible for constructing and maintaining multilevel models of resources needed for the war effort. Their models included manufacturing defects, materials lost when ships were sunk at sea, &c. Upon analyzing field reports which revealed systematic shortages, the mathematicians decided to increase allocations submitted to the board by a factor of 10.

The WPB managed 12 regional offices and operated 120 field offices throughout the nation. They worked alongside state war production boards, which maintained records on state war production facilities and also helped state businesses obtain war contracts and loans.

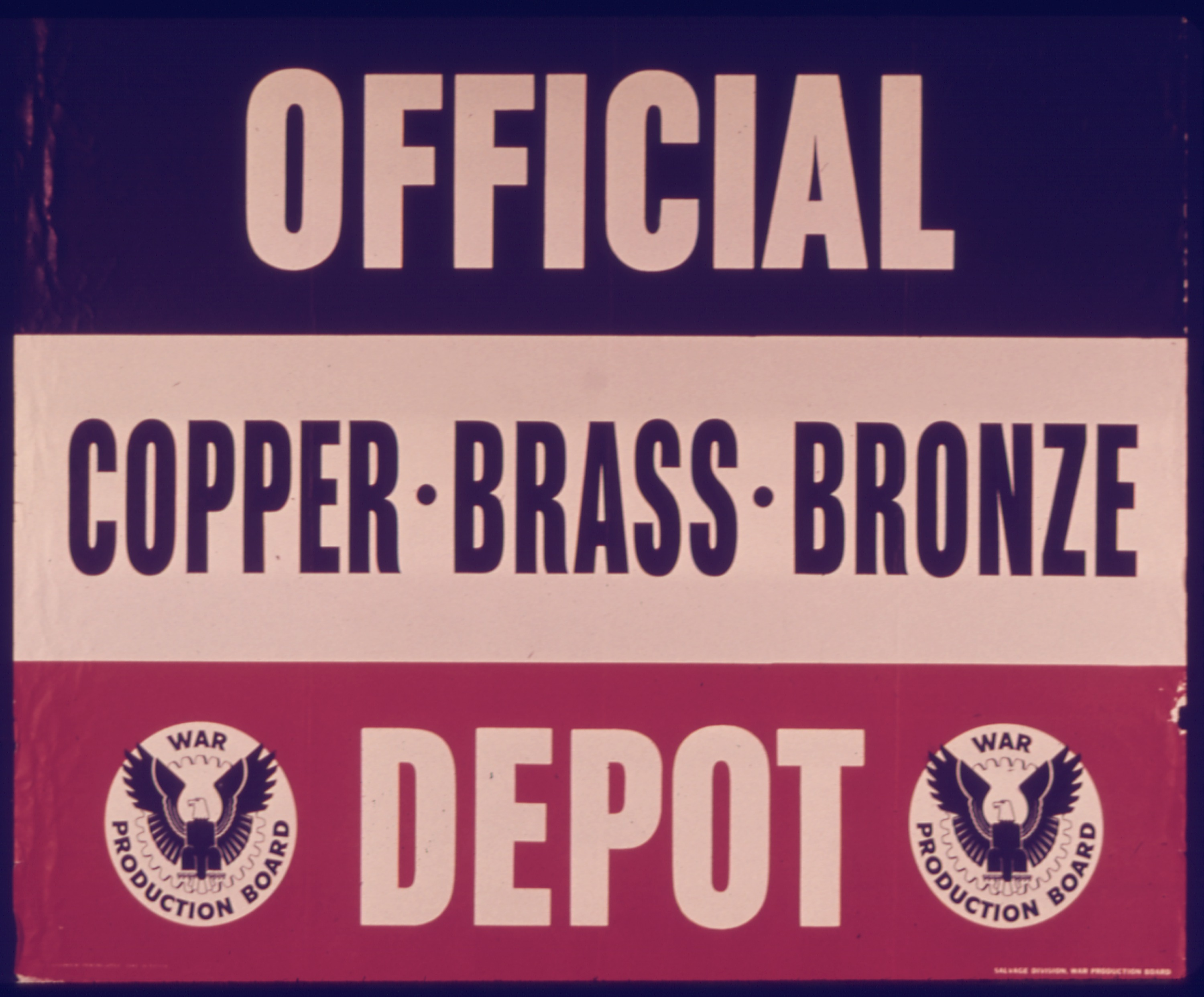

The national WPB's primary task was converting civilian industry to war production. The WPB assigned priorities and allocated scarce materials such as steel, aluminum, and rubber, prohibited nonessential industrial production such as that of nylons and refrigerators, controlled wages and prices, and mobilized the people through patriotic propaganda such as "give your scrap metal and help Oklahoma boys save our way of life". It initiated events such as scrap metal drives, which were carried out locally to great success. For example, a national scrap metal drive in October 1942 resulted in an average of almost 82 pounds (37 kg) of scrap per American.

WPB order M-9-C related to the conservation of copper and, in May 1942, The Film Daily reported that this would apply to the production of new motion picture sound and projection equipment but not to the delivery of items already produced.

== Effects ==
The WPB and the nation's factories effected a great turnaround. Military aircraft production, which totaled 6,000 in 1940, jumped to 85,000 in 1943. Factories that made silk ribbons now produced parachutes, automobile factories built tanks, typewriter companies converted to rifles, undergarment manufacturers sewed mosquito netting, and a rollercoaster manufacturer converted to the production of bomber repair platforms. The WPB ensured that each factory received the materials it needed to produce the most war goods in the shortest time.

Without American production the Allies could never have won the war.

— Joseph Stalin during a dinner at the Tehran Conference, 1943

Nelson faced extensive criticism from the military during his tenure. Described by historian Doris Kearns Goodwin as "habitually indecisive", Nelson had difficulty sorting the conflicting requests from various agencies. Secretary of War Henry L. Stimson regularly criticized Nelson for his "inability to take charge". He argued endlessly with Robert P. Patterson of the War Department. Patterson typically demanded that civilian needs be given lower priority because military supplies were essential to winning the war, and that argument usually prevailed. In February 1943, Roosevelt invited Bernard Baruch to replace Nelson as WPB head, but was persuaded to change his mind by advisor Harry Hopkins, and Nelson remained in the post.

From 1942 to 1945 the WPB directed a total production of $185 billion (equivalent to $2.55 trillion in 2024) worth of armaments and supplies. At war's end, most production restrictions were quickly lifted, and the WPB was abolished on November 3, 1945, with its remaining functions transferred to the Civilian Production Administration.

== Members ==
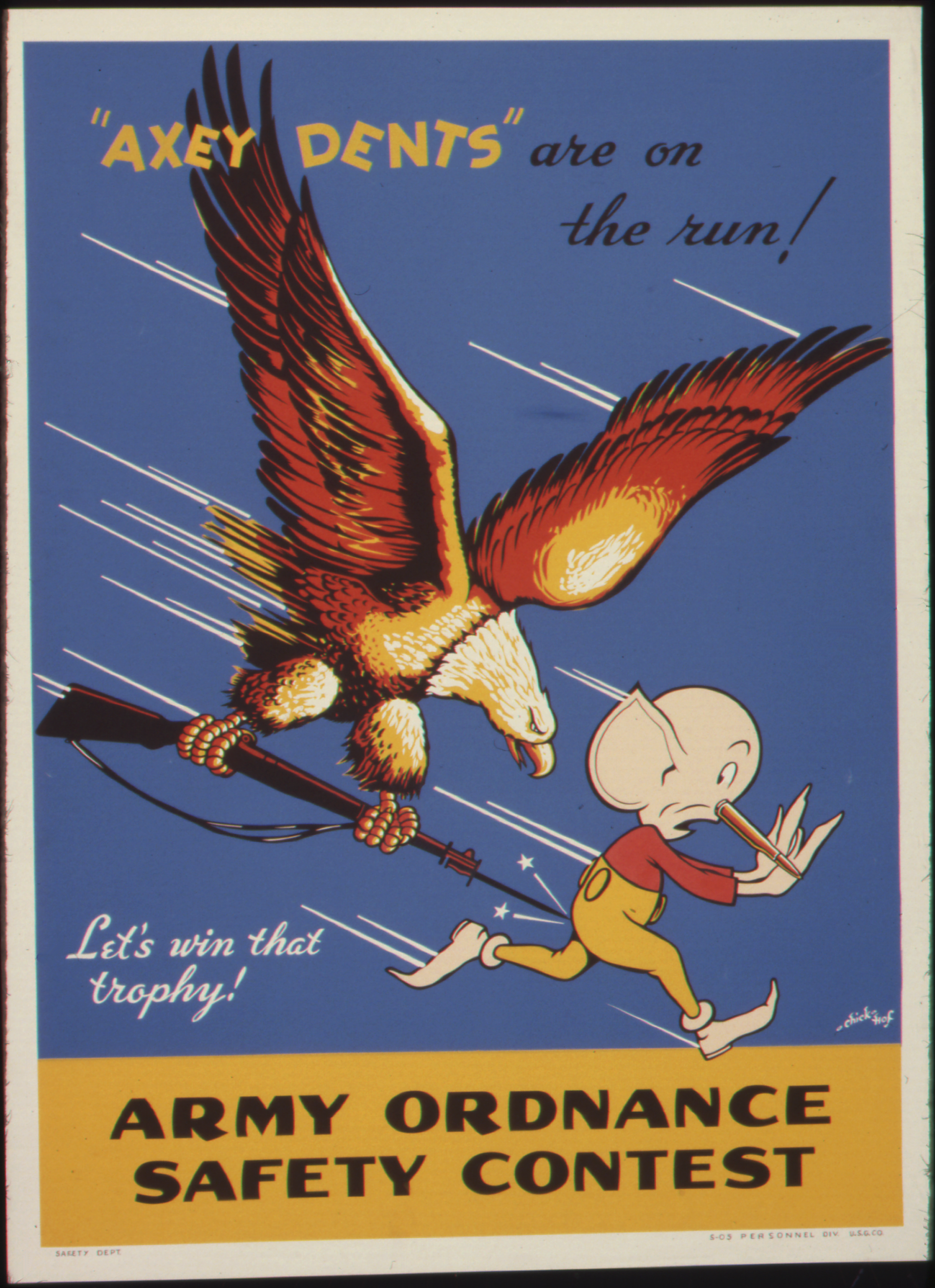
A safety campaign around ordnance by US Army published during the height of World War II (c. 1942–1943) by the War Production Board

- William Beverly Murphy, president and CEO of Campbell Soup Company
- Charles E. Wilson, president of General Electric
- T. S. Fitch, president and CEO of Washington Steel Corporation
- Faustin Johnson Solon, a chair of the War Production Board, representing O-I Glass
- Irving Brown, representing the American Federation of Labor
- Matthew M. Fox, vice president of Universal Pictures

== Civilian Production Administration ==
Executive Order 9638 created the Civilian Production Administration and terminated the War Production Board on October 4, 1945. The Civilian Production Board was consolidated with other agencies to form the Office of Temporary Controls—an agency in the Office for Emergency Management of the executive office of the president. The latter had previously been established pursuant to the Reorganization Act of 1939. The executive order provided a Temporary Controls Administrator, appointed by the president, to head the Office of Temporary Controls and vested in him, among other things, the functions of the Price Administrator.

== See also ==
- Board of Economic Warfare
- Combined Food Board, with Britain and Canada
- Combined Munitions Assignments Board, the most important board
- Combined Production and Resources Board
- Combined Raw Materials Board
- National War Labor Board
- War Manpower Commission
- Office of Price Administration
- Office of War Mobilization

== Selected publications ==
- Studies in industrial price control by United States Office of Temporary Controls. U.S. Govt. Print. Off., 1947
- Problems in price control: legal phases by United States Office of Temporary Controls. U.S. Govt. Print. Off., 1947
- Problems in price control by United States Office of Temporary Controls. U.S. Govt. Print. Off., 1948
- The beginnings of OPA by United States Office of Temporary Controls. Office of Temporary Controls, Office of Price Administration, 1947
- Guaranteed wages by United States Office of Temporary Controls. U.S. Govt. Print. Off., 1947
