= Office of Production Management =

United States Government agency, 1941-1942

Agency overview
- Formed: January 7, 1941
- Dissolved: January 24, 1942
- Superseding agency: War Production Board
- Agency executive: William S. Knudsen, Director General

The Office of Production Management was a United States government agency that existed from January 1941 to January 1942 and was led by the Danish-American automotive executive William Knudsen. The agency was established to centralize direction of the federal procurement programs and quasi-war production during the period immediately preceding the United States' involvement in World War II. After the United States formally entered World War II, the War Production Board superseded the Office of Production Management in January 1942 and the office ceased to exist shortly thereafter. It was established and distestablished by Executive Order of President Franklin D. Roosevelt.
