= Military production during World War II =

Arms and munitions produced during the Second World War

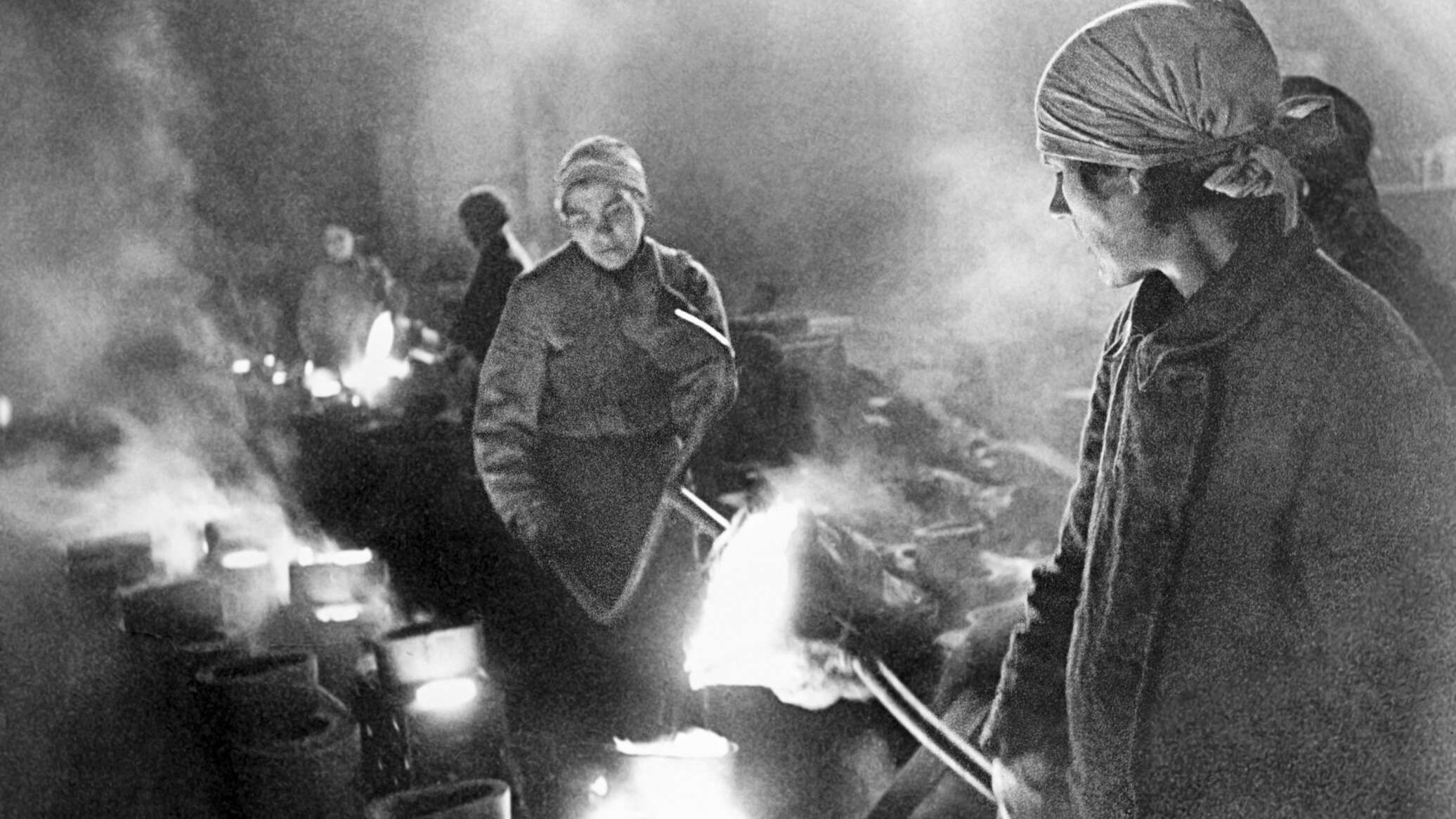
Russian women working in a city factory at the height of the Siege of Leningrad

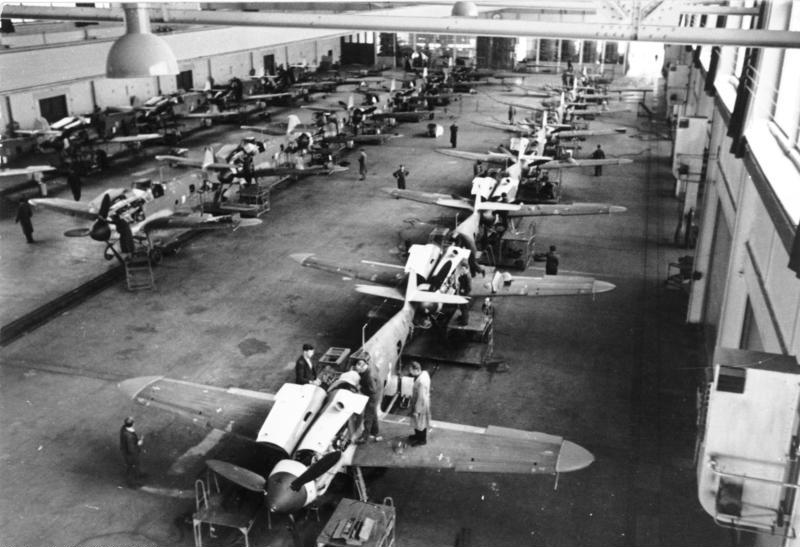
Assembly line of Messerschmitt Bf 109G-6 fighters in a German aircraft factory

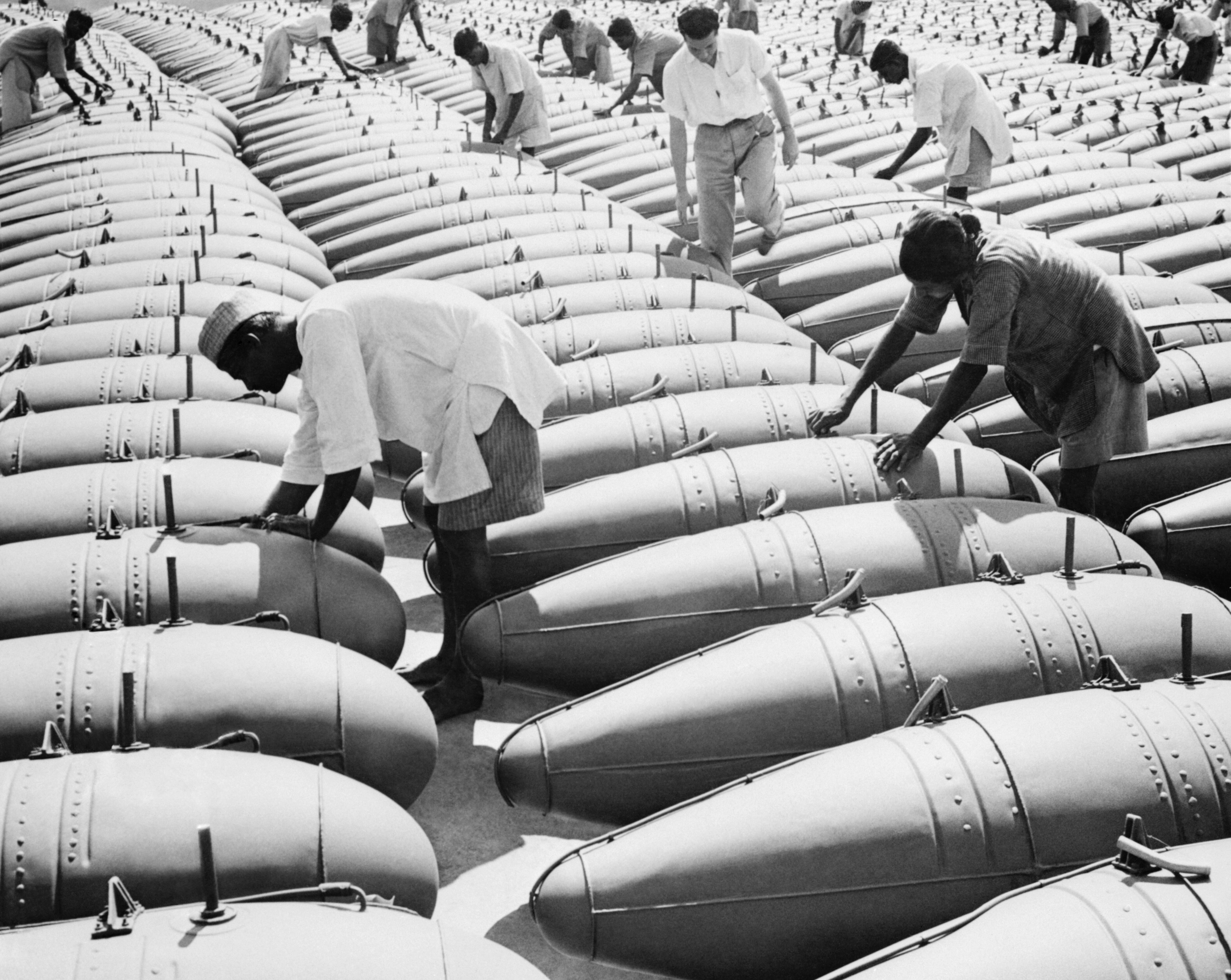
Indian workers check new fuel drop tanks at the Hindustan Aircraft Factory in Bangalore, 1944

Military production during World War II was the production or mobilization of arms, ammunition, personnel and financing by the belligerents of the war, from the Anschluss in early 1938 to the surrender and occupation of Japan in late 1945.

The mobilization of funds, people, natural resources and material for the production and supply of military equipment and military forces during World War II was a critical component of the war effort. During the conflict, the Allies outpaced the Axis powers in most production categories. Access to the funding and industrial resources necessary to sustain the war effort was linked to their respective economic and political alliances.

== Historical context ==
During the 1930s, political forces in Germany increased their financial investment in the military to develop the armed forces required to support near and long-term political and territorial goals. Germany's economic, scientific, research, and industrial capabilities were among the most technically advanced in the world at the time, supporting a rapidly growing, innovative military. However, access to (and control of) the resources and production capacity required to entertain long-term goals (such as European control, German territorial expansion and the destruction of the USSR) were limited. Political demands necessitated the expansion of Germany's control of natural and human resources, industrial capacity and farmland beyond its borders. Germany's military production was tied to resources outside its area of control, a great disadvantage as compared to the Allies.

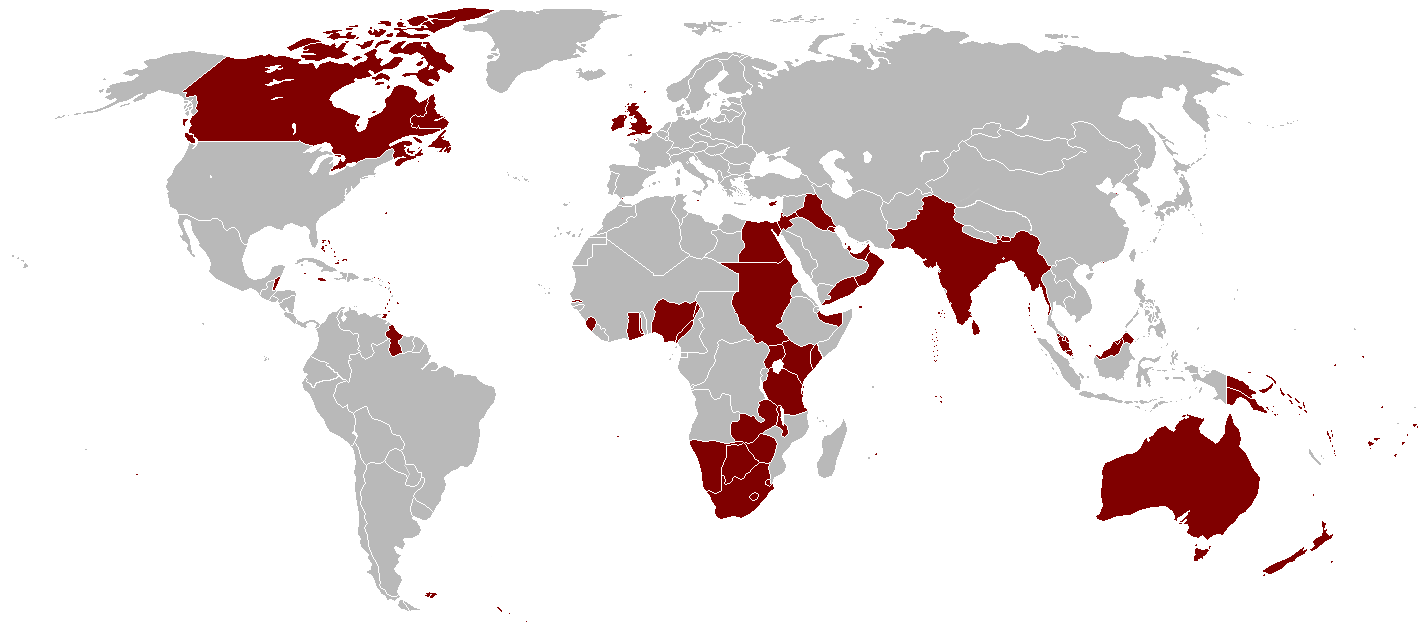
British Empire in 1921

In 1938 Britain was the world's superpower, with political and economic control of a quarter of the world's population, industry and resources, and closely allied with the independent Dominion nations (such as Canada and South Africa). From mid-1940 to mid-1942, the British coordinated the Allied effort in all global theatres. They fought the German, Italian, Japanese and Vichy armies, air forces and navies across Europe, Africa, Asia, the Middle East, India, the Mediterranean and in the Atlantic, Indian, Pacific and Arctic Oceans. British forces destroyed Italian armies in North and East Africa, and occupied or enlisted overseas colonies of occupied European nations. Following engagements with Axis forces, British Empire troops occupied Libya, Italian Somaliland, Eritrea, Ethiopia, Iran and Iraq. The Empire funded and delivered supplies by Arctic convoys to the USSR, and supported Free French forces to recapture French Equatorial Africa. Britain also established governments in exile in London to rally support in occupied Europe for the Allied effort. The British held back or slowed the Axis powers for three years while mobilising their globally integrated economy and industrial infrastructure to build what became, by 1942, the most extensive military apparatus of the war. This allowed their later allies (such as the United States) to mobilise their economies and develop the military forces required to play a role in the war effort, and for the British to go on the offensive in its theatres of operation.

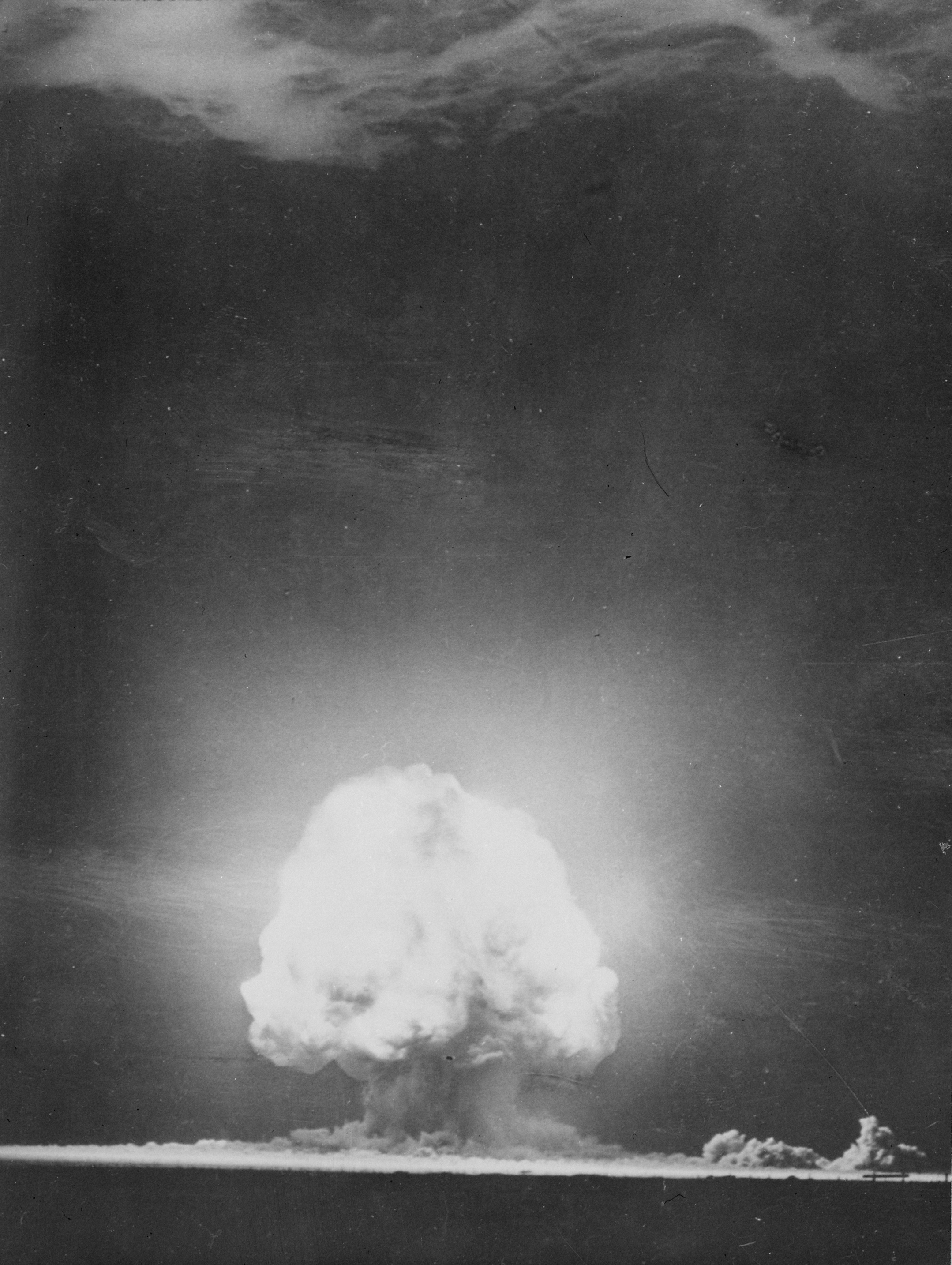
The first atomic bomb

The entry of the United States into the war in late 1941 injected financial, human and industrial resources into Allied operations. The US produced more than its own military forces required and armed itself and its allies for the most industrialized war in history. At the beginning of the war, the British and French placed large orders for aircraft with American manufacturers and the US Congress approved plans to increase its air forces by 3,000 planes. In May 1940, Franklin D. Roosevelt called for the production of 185,000 aeroplanes, 120,000 tanks, 55,000 anti-aircraft guns and 18 million tons of merchant shipping in two years. Adolf Hitler was told by his advisors that this was American propaganda; in 1939, annual aircraft production for the US military was less than 3,000 planes. By the end of the war US factories had produced 300,000 planes, and by 1944 had produced two-thirds of the Allied military equipment used in the war — bringing military forces into play in North and South America, the Caribbean, the Atlantic, Western Europe and the Pacific.

The U.S. produced vast quantities of military equipment into late 1945, including nuclear weapons, and became the strongest, most technologically advanced military force in the world. In addition to out-producing the Axis, the Allies produced technological innovations; through the Tizard Mission, British contributions included radar (instrumental in winning the Battle of Britain), sonar (improving their ability to sink U-boats), and the proximity fuze; the Americans led the British-originated Manhattan Project (which eliminated the need to invade Japan). The proximity fuze, for example, was five times as effective as contact or timed fuzes and was devastating in naval use against Japanese aircraft and so effective against German ground troops that General George S. Patton said it "won the Battle of the Bulge for us."

The human and social costs of the war on the population of the USSR were immense, with combat deaths alone in the millions. Recognising the importance of their population and industrial production to the war effort, the USSR evacuated the majority of its European territory—moving 2,500 factories, 17 million people and great quantities of resources to the east. Out of German reach, the USSR produced equipment and forces critical to their victory in Europe. Over one million women served in the Soviet armed forces.

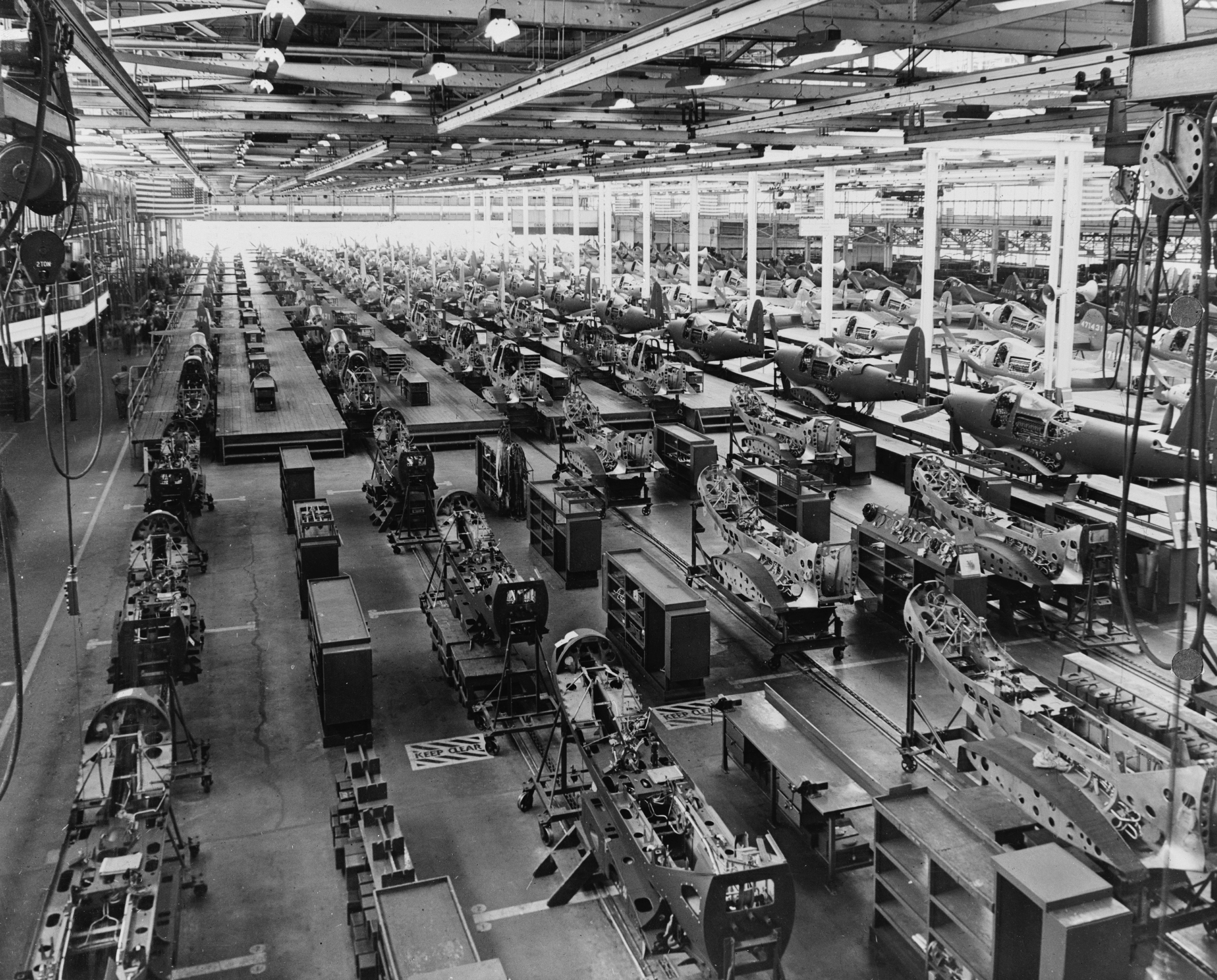
Assembly line production of Bell P-39 Airacobra and Bell P-63 Kingcobra fighter aircraft near Niagara Falls, New York

The statistics below illustrate the extent to which the Allies outproduced the Axis. Production of machine tools tripled, and thousands of ships were built in shipyards which did not exist before the war. According to William S. Knudsen, "We won because we smothered the enemy in an avalanche of production, the like of which he had never seen, nor dreamed possible."

Access to resources and to large, controlled international labour pools, and the ability to build arms in relative peace, were critical to the eventual victory of the Allies. Donald Douglas (founder of the Douglas Aircraft Company) declared, "Here's proof that free men can out-produce slaves."

== Production summaries, 1939–1945 ==
=== Personnel, thousands ===
Service	Allies	Axis
Combat	25,000	10,000
Auxiliary force	15,000	7,500
Merchant marine	50,000	0
Irregulars	90,000	12,500
Total	180,000	30,000

=== Major weapons groups ===
System	Allies	Axis
Tanks, self-propelled artillery, vehicles	4,358,650	670,288
Artillery, mortars, guns	6,792,696	1,363,490
Aircraft	637,249	300,000
Missiles	(only for test)	45,558
Ships	54,931	1,670

=== Economy ===
In thousands of international dollars, at 2014 prices.

Service	Allies	Axis
GDP	97,707,908,723.20	10,268,201,776.37
Expenditure		

=== Vital commerce and raw materials, tons ===
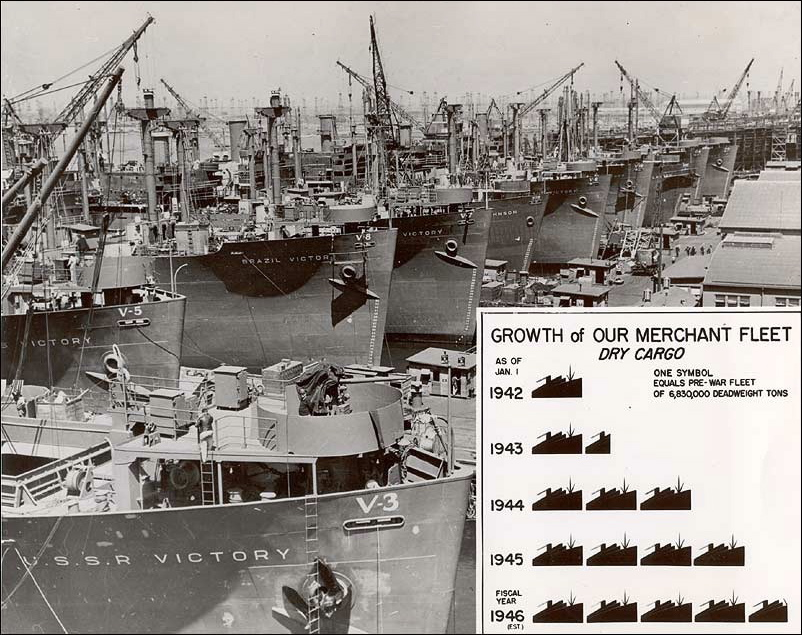
To move raw materials and supply distant forces, large numbers of cargo ships had to be built.

Category	Allies	Axis
Cargo ships	47,169	12,762
Merchant shipping	46,817,172	5,621,967
Coal	4,581,400,000	2,629,900,000
Crude oil	1,043,000,000	66,000,000
Steel	733,006,633	x
Aluminium	5,104,697	1,199,150
Asbestos	3,934,043	x

- Cargo and resources in metric tonnes.

== Production overview: service, power and type ==
=== Land forces ===
Power	Tanks & SPGs	Armoured vehicles	Other vehicles	Artillery	Mortars	Machine guns	Personnel
British Empire	47,862	47,420	1,475,521	226,113	239,540	1,090,410	17,192,533
USA and territories	108,410		2,382,311	257,390	105,055	2,679,840	16,000,000
USSR	119,769		265,000	516,648	363,012	1,477,400	34,401,807
Other							
Allies	270,041	47,420	4,054,932	1,000,151	707,607	5,247,650	67,594,000
Germany and territories	67,429	49,777	159,147	73,484	104,864	1,000,730	14,540,835
Hungary	973	530	5,224	447	2,700	4,583	730,000
Romania	214	251	4,300	1,800	4,300	10,000	1,220,000
Italian Empire	3,368	1,240	83,000	7,200	22,000	140,000	4,300,000
Japanese Empire	4,524	2,200	165,945	13,350	49,000	380,000	8,100,000
Other							
Axis	76,385	50,028	413,316	97,281	182,864	1,395,313	28,890,800

=== Air forces ===
Power	Total aircraft	Fighters	Attack	Bombers	Recon	Transport	Training	Other	Personnel
British Empire	177,025	38,786	33,811	38,158	7,014	12,585	46,256	415	1,927,395
USA and territories	295,959	99,465		96,872	4,106	23,900	58,085	13,531	2,403,806
USSR	136,223	22,301	37,549	21,116		17,332	4,061	33,864	
Other									
Allies	609,207	160,552	71,360	156,146	11,120	53,817	108,402	47,810	
Germany and territories	133,387	57,653	8,991	28,577	5,025	8,396	14,311	11,361	3,402,200
Romania	1,113	513	272	128	0	200	0	0	
Italian Empire	13,402	9,157	34	3,381	388	2,471	968	3	
Japanese Empire	64,484	33,405	9,558	11,943	3,709	1,073	3,420	1,376	
Other	9,849	881	4	395	318	1,880	5,145	57	
Axis	222,235	98,609	18,859	44,424	11,002	14,020	22,944	12,794	

=== Naval forces ===
Power	Total large ships	Carriers (escort carriers)	Battleships	Cruisers	Destroyers	Frigates & Destroyer Escorts	Other large vessels	Corvettes	Sloops	Patrol boats	Submarines (includes midget submarines)	De/ Mining	Landing craft	Personnel
British Empire	558	15 (29)	5	35	202	270	2	338	33	4,209	238	1,244	9,538	1,227,415
USA and territories	2020	29 (121)	10	52	396	1014	398			773	234		35,000	4,000,000
USSR	63		0	6	54		3				68			
France	9		2		7									
Other	8	(2)		2	4				1		9	1		
Allies	2658	44(152)	17	95	663	1284	403	338	34	4,982	577	1,245	44,538	
Germany & territories	38	0	4	3	31						1,119		540	1,500,000
Italian Empire	82	0	3	3	17	59					83			
Japanese Empire	278	14(6)	2	12	63	175	6				867			
Romania										8	2	5		
Other														
Axis	398	14(6)	9	18	111	234	6				2,069			

=== Munitions ===
Munitions Production in World War II (Expenditures in billions of dollars, US 1944 munitions prices)
Country/Alliance	Year						
Country/Alliance	Average 1935-39	1940	1941	1942	1943	1944	Total 1939–44
U.S.A.	0.3	1.5	4.5	20.0	38.0	42.0	106.3
Britain	0.5	3.5	6.5	9.0	11.0	11.0	41.5
U.S.S.R.	1.6	5.0	8.5	11.5	14.0	16.0	56.6
Allies Total	2.4	10.0	20.0	41.5	64.5	70.5	204.4
Germany	2.4	6.0	6.0	8.5	13.5	17.0	53.4
Japan	0.4	1.0	2.0	3.0	4.5	6.0	16.9
Axis Total	2.8	7.0	8.0	11.5	18.0	23.0	70.3

=== Commercial forces ===
	British Empire	USA	USSR	Germany	Hungary	Italy	Japan	Romania
Harbour craft	1,092							
Cargo	1,361							
Cargo tonnage	12,823,942	33,993,230				1,469,606	4,152,361	

=== Resources ===
Country	Coal	Iron ore	Crude oil	Steel	Aluminium	Nickel	Zinc
USA	2,149.7	396.9	833.2				
Britain	1,441.2	119.2	90.8	3.700	0.205		
Australia	83.1						1.56
India	196.7	6.0		1.12			
Canada	101.9	3.6	8.4	16.4	3.500		
New Zealand	18	1.0					
USSR	590.8	71.3	110.6		0.263	0.069	0.384
Total Allied	4581.4	597	1043	21.22	3.968	0.069	1.944
Germany	2,420.3	240.7	33.4		1.9	0.046	2.1
Japan	184.5	21.0	5.2				
Italy	16.9	4.4	2.3				
Hungary	6.6	14.1	3.1				
Romania	1.6	10.8	25.0				
Total Axis	2629.9	291	69		1.9	0.046	2.1

All figures in millions of tonnes

== Gross domestic product ==
Ratio of GDP between the major Allied and Axis powers 1938–1945

Gross domestic product (GDP) provides insight into the relative strength of the belligerents in the run up to, and during the conflict.

Gross domestic product (Note: Billions of international dollars, at 1990 prices. Adjusted annually for changing compositions within each alliance.)
Country	1938	1939	1940	1941	1942	1943	1944	1945
United Kingdom	284	287	316	344	353	361	346	331
Dominions	115							
Colonies	285							
British Empire	684	687	716	744	753	761	746	731
France	186	199	82	130	116	110	93	101
Colonies	49							
French Empire	235	248	131	179	165	159	142	150
Soviet Union	359	366	417	359	274	305	362	343
Occupied								
Soviet Union Total	359	366	417	359	274	305	362	343
United States	800	869	943	1094	1235	1399	1499	1474
Colonies	24							
United States Total	824	893	968	1118	1259	1423	1523	1498
Nationalist China	320.5							
German Reich	351	384	387	412	417	426	437	310
Occupied		77	430	733	733	430	244	
German Reich Total	351	461	817	1145	1150	856	681	310
Italy	141	151	147	144	145	137	117	92
Colonies	3							
Occupied			20	20	20	20		
Italian Empire	144	154	170	167	168	160	140	115
Japan	169	184	192	196	197	194	189	144
Colonies	63							
Occupied								
Japanese Empire	232	247	255	259	260	257	252	207
Romania	24							
Hungary	24							
Bulgaria	10							
Albania	1							

Romanian, Hungarian, Bulgarian and Albanian GDP calculated by multiplying the GDP per capita of the four countries in 1938 ($1,242 for Romania, $2,655 for Hungary, $1,595 for Bulgaria and over $900 for Albania) by their estimated populations in 1938: 19,750,000 for Romania, 9,082,400 for Hungary, 6,380,000 for Bulgaria and 1,040,400 for Albania.

Table notes

1. France to Axis: 1940:50% (light green), 1941–44:100% (brown)
2. USSR to Allies: 1941:44% (light green), 1942–1945:100%.
3. US direct support to the Allies begins with Lend Lease in March 1941, though the US made it possible for the Allies to purchase US-produced materiel from 1939
4. Italy to Allies and Axis: 1938:0%, 1939–1943:100% Axis (brown), 1944-1945:100% Allies
5. Japanese to Axis begins with Tripartite Pact in 1940
6. The Allied and Axis totals are not the immediate sum of the table values; see the distribution rules used above.

== United States World War II GDP (compared to other countries) ==
=== GDP during World War II ===
- Debt and higher taxes led to GDP growth percentages over 17%. This trend continued throughout the war and stopped increasing after the war ended. For the United States, government spending was used as a positive indicator of GDP growth. However the high rates of government only was beneficial for a short period of time, a trend that can be seen in most wars.
- In 1939, Britain spent 9% of its GDP on defence; this rose drastically after the start of World War II to around 40%. By the year 1945 government spending had peaked at 52% of the national GDP.
- Before joining World War II US government spending in 1941 represented 30% of GDP, or about $408 billion. In 1944 at the peak of World War II, government spending had risen to over $1.6 trillion about 79% of the GDP. During this three-year period the total GDP represented by government spending rose 294%.

=== US unemployment during World War II ===
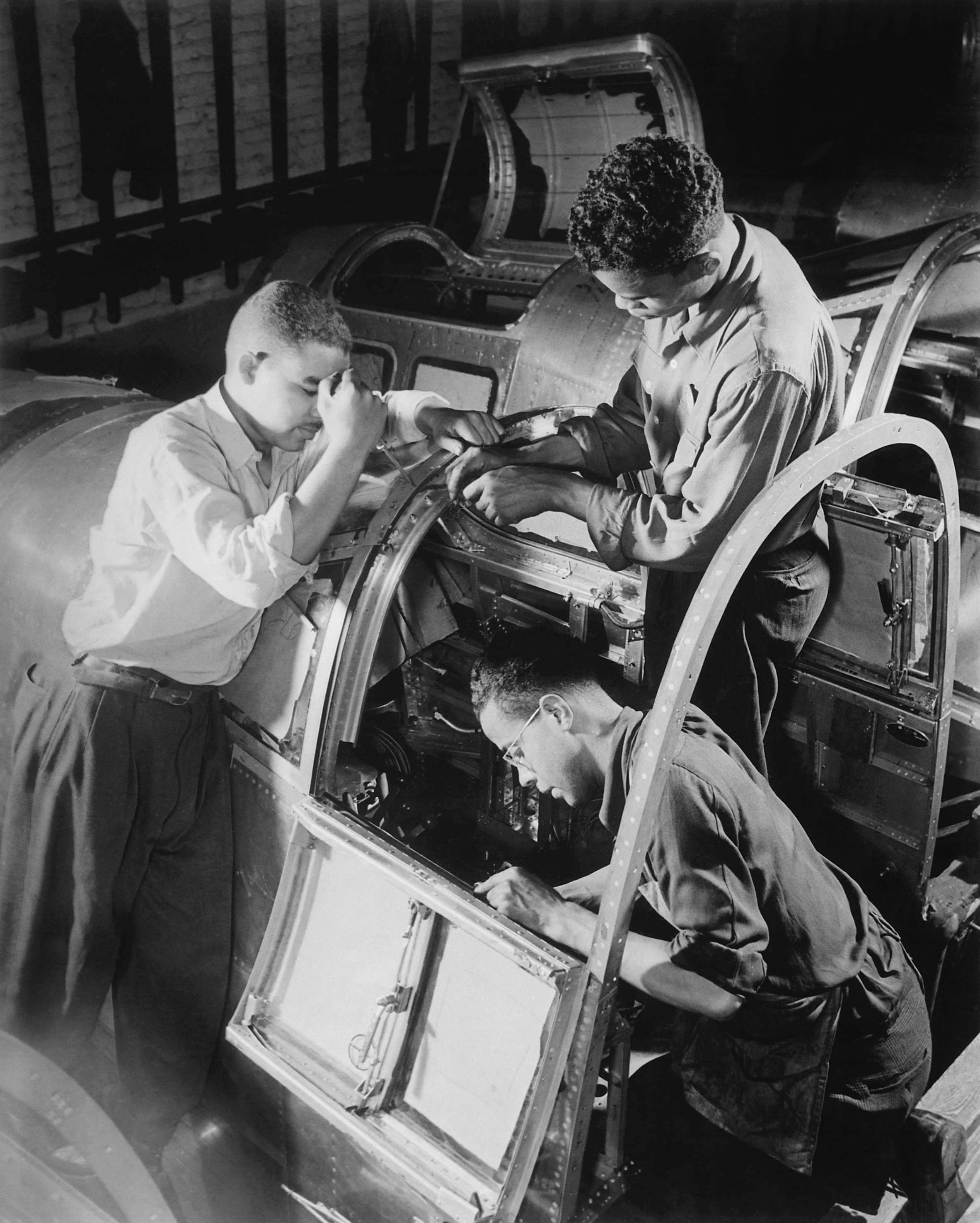
Three African-American workers complete the pilot's compartment of an aircraft, 1942

- During World War II unemployment by 1945 had fallen to 1.9% from 14.6% in 1940. 20% of the population during the war was employed within the armed forces.
- The beginning years of World War II shows a spike in employment, but towards the end of the war decreased significantly. The employment spike was in relation to the tremendous amount of war production which the U.S. was undertaking. Examples of high numbers of employment could have been seen in at Gulf Shipbuilding which obtained 240 employees at the beginning of 1940 and increased to 11,600 employees in 1943. Alabama Dry dock also was an exemplary business in employment that raised number from 1,000 workers to 30,000 in the most productive years of the war. Demographics of employment consisted of eight million women including African Americans and Latinas, adding to the 24 million that searched for defensive jobs outside of the war.

=== Price of war ===
Many concerns and political influence come from the price of war. While GDP can easily increase federal expenditures, it also can influence political elections and government decision making. No matter how much percentages of GDP increase or decrease we need higher amounts of GDP in order to pay for more investments, one of those investments being more wars. To pay for these wars, taxes are held at a very high rate. For example, by the end of World War II tax rates went from 1.5% to 15%. Along with tax percentages reaching high amounts, spending on non-defense programs were cut in half during the period of World War II. Tax cuts allow one to see GDP in effect for the average American. Still, almost ten years after World War II, in 1950 and 1951 congress raised taxes close to 4% in order to pay for the Korean War. After the Korean War, in 1968 taxes again were raised 10% to pay for the Vietnam War. This caused GDP to increase 1%. Although research can support positive relationship between production and jobs with GDP, research can also show the negative relationship with tax increases and GDP.

==== US wartime production ====
Prior to the Second World War, the United States was cautious with regard to its manufacturing capabilities as the country was still recovering from the Great Depression. However, during the war, President Franklin D. Roosevelt set ambitious production goals to fulfill. The early 1940s were set to have 60,000 aircraft increasing to 125,000 in 1943. In addition, targets for the production of 120,000 tanks and 55,000 aircraft were set during the same time period. The Ford Motor Company in Michigan built one motor car (comprising 15,000 parts) on the assembly lines every 69 seconds. Ford's production contributed to America's total production of vehicles totalling three million in 1941. American production numbers caused the US employed workforce to increase massively. America's yearly production exceeded Japan's production building more planes in 1944 than Japan built in all the war years combined. As a result, half of the world's war production came from America. The government paid for this production using techniques of selling war bonds to financial institutions, rationing household items and raising taxes.

One part of the US wartime manufacturing boom can be ascribed to Alcoa's second major reduction plant in Mobile, Alabama starting in 1937. At first serving mainly the Japanese market, the plant prepared thousands of tons of aluminum for the production of aeroplanes during the war. The United States quickly adjusted to the levels of production required to equip its military with the millions of war products used during World War II.

=== Personnel – Allied – Britain, dominions and possessions ===
Including all non-British subjects in British services.

	Army	Army (female)	Navy	Navy (female)	Marines	Air Force	Air Force (female)	Auxiliary	Merchant marine	Partisans	Total combat	Other labour
Aden											1,200	
Australia	727,703	24,026	36,976	3,000		124,007	27,000		4,500		942,712	
Argentine volunteers	1,700		1,700			600					4,000	
Basutoland/Bechuana/Swaziland	10,000										36,000	
Free Belgian Forces	42,300		1,200			1,900					45,770	370
Britain	3,300,000	210,309	865,000	74,000	78,500	1,208,000	181,909	1,500,000	185,000		7,602,718	
B. Indian Ocean	6,500										6,500	
Canada	705,374	25,251	99,822	7,100		222,501	27,123	82,163	18,000		1,187,334	
Caribbean / Bermuda											10,000	
Ceylon											26,000	
Chinese volunteers									10,000		10,000	
Cyprus	30,000										30,000	
Czech volunteers	4,000					2,000					6,000	
East Africa	200,000										228,000	
Egypt	100,000										100,000	
Falklands											200	
Fiji	7,000							1,071			7,000	
Free French Forces			3,700			20					3,720	
Free Greek	5,000		8,500			250					14,000	
Gibraltar											700	
Guiana, British	32	10	42			33		48			196	31
Hong Kong	2,200										2,200	
India	2,500,000	11,000	45,947			30,000			50,000		2,586,957	14,000,000
Ireland	70,000										70,000	
Lesotho	21,000										21,000	
Free Luxembourg	80										80	
Malaysia	1,500		1,450					3,215		4,800	10,965	
Malta											8,200	
Mauritius								6,800			3,500	
Nepal	250,280										250,280	
Free Dutch	4,000	1,000				1000			12.000		6,000	
South Africa											?	
Total	7,988,669	271,596	1,064,337	84,100	78,500	1,590,311	236,032	1,593,297	267,512	4,800	13,221,232	14,000,401

Note:

1. Auxiliary units include Home Guard, Reserves, Police regiments, etc.

=== Personnel – Axis – German Reich ===
This includes all German and non-German subjects serving within German Reich forces.

	Army	Army (female)	Navy	Navy (female)	Marines	Air force	Air force (female)	Auxiliary	Merchant marine	Partisans	Total combat	Other labour
Albania	9,000										9,000	
Arab legion	20,000										20,000	
Belgium	22,000										22,000	
Bulgaria	30,000										90,000	
Croatia	55,500		500			400		32,000			88,400	
Czech	6,465										6,465	
Denmark	12,000										12,000	
Finland vol	2,500										2,500	
France & territories	8,000		4,500					5,080			17,580	348,500
Germany & territories	14,793,200		1,500,000			3,400,000					19,693,200	
Greece								22,000			22,000	
Hungary	40,000										40,000	
Italy	18,000										18,000	
India	4,500										4,500	
Luxembourg	12,035										12,035	
Netherlands	45,000										45,000	
Norway	5,000		1,500			1,500					4,500	
Poland	75,000							45,000			120,000	
Portugal	200										200	
Romania	55,000										55,000	
Serbia	10,000										10,000	
Slovakia	45,000										45,000	
Slovenia	6,000										6,000	
Spain	47,000										47,000	
Sweden	300										300	
Switzerland	800										800	
USSR	1,051,000					300		100,000			1,151,300	
Total	16,336,755		1,506,500			3,402,200		204,080			21,582,300	348,000

Note:

1. Auxiliary units include Home Guard, Wehrmachtsgefolge, Reserves, Police regiments, etc.
2. USSR includes Armenia 4k SS, 14k Wehr, 7k Aux; Azerbaijan 55k SS, 70k Wehr; Belarus 12k Wehr, 20k Aux; Cossack 200k Wehr; Estonia 20k SS, 50k Wehr, 7k Aux; Georgia 10k SS; 30k Wehr; Kalmyk 5k Wehr; Latvia 55k SS; 87k Wehr, 300 Air, 23k Aux; Lithuania 50k Wehr, 10 Aux; North Caucuses 4k SS; Russia 60k SS, 26k Wehr; Turkestan 16k Wehr; Ukrainian 300k Wehr; 2k Aux; Tatar/Urals 12k Wehr

=== Aircraft – Allied – British Empire ===
Within the UK, initially aircraft production was very vulnerable to enemy bombing. To expand and diversify the production base the British set up shadow factories. These brought other manufacturing companies – such as vehicle manufacturers – into aircraft production, or aircraft parts production. These inexperienced companies were set up in groups under the guidance or control of the aircraft manufacturers. New factory buildings were provided with government money.

Fighters	Australia	Britain	Canada	India	New Zealand	South Africa	Total
Blackburn Roc (naval)		136					136
Boulton Paul Defiant		1,065					1065
CAC Boomerang	250						250
CAC Mustang (Note: Almost all produced post-war)	200						200
de Havilland Hornet (Note: Entered service after the war)		60					60
de Havilland Vampire		244					244
Fairey Firefly (naval)		872					872
Fairey Fulmar (naval)		600					600
Gloster Gladiator (Note: Wartime production only. Majority of Gladiators were built before the war. 165 additional to export customers. Sea Gladiator conversions and production in Sea Gladiator entry.)		98					98
Gloster Meteor		239					239
Hawker Hurricane		14,231	1,451				15,682
Hawker Tempest		1,702					1,702
Hawker Typhoon		3,330					3,330
Supermarine Seafire (naval) (Note: Includes some post-war production and conversions of Spitfires)		2,334					2,334
Supermarine Spitfire		20,351					20,351
Westland Whirlwind		116					116
Total Fighters	450	50,897	2,077				53,424
Bombers	Australia	Britain	Canada	India	New Zealand	South Africa	
Armstrong Whitworth Whitley (Note: Includes pre-war production)		1,780					1,780
Avro Lancaster		7,307	430				7,377
Avro Lincoln (Note: 3 prototypes and 3 delivered to RAF)		6	1				6
Avro Manchester		202					202
Fairey Barracuda (naval)		2,607					2,607
Blackburn Skua (naval)		192					192
Bristol Beaufighter	364 (Note: Several dozen completed post-war)	5,564					5,928
Bristol Beaufort	700	1,429					2,129
Bristol Blenheim		5,519	626				6,145
Bristol Buckingham (Note: Not used as bombers but for other purposes)		119					119
de Havilland Mosquito	212	6,199	1,134				7,545
Fairchild SBF & CCF SBW Helldiver			1,134				1,134
Fairey Albacore (naval)		800					800
Fairey Swordfish (naval)		2,396					2,396
Handley Page Halifax		6,178 (Note: Includes transport and Coastal Command reconnaissance versions)					6,178
Handley Page Hampden		152	160				312
Short Stirling		2,383					2,383
Vickers Wellington		11,461					11,461
Total Bombers	1,349	44,391	3,019				54,577
Reconnaissance & patrol	Australia	Britain	Canada	India	New Zealand	South Africa	
Bristol Bolingbroke (Note: Includes 457 trainers)			676				626
Bristol Bombay (bomber/transport)		51					51
Blackburn Botha		580					580
Blackburn Shark			17				17
Consolidated Canso			721				993
Piper Cub			150				150
Saro Lerwick		21					21
Supermarine Sea Otter		292					292
Short Seaford		10					10
Short Sunderland		767					767
Supermarine Stranraer			39				39
Supermarine Walrus		746					746
Taylorcraft Auster		1,800					1,800
Vickers Warwick		845					845
Total reconnaissance		5,112	882				6,937
Transport	Australia	Britain	Canada	India	New Zealand	South Africa	
Airspeed Horsa		5,000					5,000
Armstrong Whitworth Albemarle		602					602
Armstrong Whitworth Whitley		1,814					1,814
Avro Lancastrian		82	6				82
Avro York		259	1				259
de Havilland Australia DHA-G1/G2 (glider)	8						8
de Havilland Dragon Dominie		474					474
de Havilland Flamingo		14					14
General Aircraft Hamilcar (glider)		412					412
General Aircraft Hotspur (glider)		1,015					1,015
Miles Messenger		93					93
Miles Monitor		22					22
Noorduyn Norseman			861				861
Northrop/Canadian-Vickers Delta (Note: Most built pre-war)			19				19
Percival Petrel		7					7
Short S.26		3					3
Slingsby Hengist (glider)		18					18
Westland Lysander (air observation, liaison, target tug)		1,445	225				1,670
total Transports	8	11,260	1,112				12,381
Trainers	Australia	Britain	Canada	India	New Zealand	South Africa	
Airspeed Oxford		8,586					8,586
Avions Fairey Tipsy B		15					15
Avro Anson		8,488	3,197				11,685
Bristol Buckmaster		112					112
CAC Wackett	202						202
CAC Wirraway (Note: Includes pre-war and post-war production)	755						755
de Havilland Don		30					30
de Havilland Moth Minor		100					100
de Havilland Tiger Moth	1,080	5,738	1,748		150		8,716
Fairchild Cornell (PT-19/26)			1,642				1,642
Fairey Battle (Note: Most production was pre-war)		2,201					2,201
Fleet Finch			606				606
Fleet Fort			101				101
Hawker Henley		200					200
Harlow PC-5			5	50			55
Miles Magister		1,303					1,303
Miles Martinet		1,724					1,724
Miles Master		3,250					3,250
Miles Mentor		45					45
North American Harvard			3,985				3,985
Percival Proctor		1,143					1,143
Total Trainers	2,037	32,935	11,284	50	150		46,456
Other	Australia	Britain	Canada	India	New Zealand	South Africa	Empire
Prototypes (Note: Of all types of aircraft not entering service)	2	61	1				
Other		78	2				
Total other	2	139 (Note: Includes: Folland Fo.108 engine test bed (12), General Aircraft Cygnet (10), General Aircraft GAL-41 (1), Hawker Sea Fury (10), Miles Mercury (6), Percival Vega Gull (~20), Supermarine Spiteful fighter (19))	3 (Note: Includes: CCF Maple Leaf Trainer II (2 plus 10 built in Mexico))				144
Grand Total	3,846	144,734	18,377	50	150	0	173,759

=== Aircraft – Allies – France, Poland and minor powers ===
Production numbers until the time of the German occupation of the respective country. Some types listed were in production before the war, those listed were still in production at the time of or after the Munich crisis.

Allied aircraft production
Fighters	Belgium	Czechoslovakia	Denmark	France	Netherlands	Poland	Yugoslavia	Total
Avia B.534-IV/Bk.534		274						
Caudron CR.714				90				
Dewoitine D.520				403				
Fokker D.XXI			10		110			120
Koolhoven F.K.58					20 (Note: Delivered to France.)			
Avions Fairey Fox VI/VII	106							
Fokker G.I					63			
Hawker Hurricane I	15						20	
Ikarus IK-2							12	
Rogozarski IK-3							12	
Bloch MB.151/152				636				
Morane-Saulnier MS.406				1,077				
Potez 630/631				280				
PZL.50 Jastrząb						(6) (Note: First prototype incomplete by German occupation.)		
PZL P.24						118 (Note: Only 1 (designated P.11g) used by Poland in 1939. The remaining ones were exported to various Balkan countries.)		
Arsenal VG.33/36/39				40 (Note: Around 200 more airframes were in advanced production stage.)				
Total	121	274	10	2,526	193	119 (+5)	44	3,287 (Note: not counting uncompleted PZL.50)
Attack	Belgium	Czechoslovakia	Denmark	France	Netherlands	Poland	Yugoslavia	Total
Breguet Br.690				230				
Latécoère 298 (naval torpedo bomber/dive bomber)				121				
Loire-Nieuport LN.40				68				
Fairey P.4/34			(12) (Note: Production was started in Denmark, but not completed before the German invasion.)					
Rogožarski PVT (Note: Originally an advanced fighter-training aircraft, this type was later used as a light attack plane, in particular by the Air Force of the Independent State of Croatia.)							61	
Total			(12)	419			61	480 (Note: not counting P.4/34)
Bombers	Belgium	Czechoslovakia	Denmark	France	Netherlands	Poland	Yugoslavia	Total
Aero A.101		64						
Aero A.304		19						
Amiot 351/354				80				
Avia B-71		61						
Fairey Battle I	18		(Note: According to some sources license production started in Denmark but not completed before the German invasion.)					
Fokker C.X/Fokker C.XI					53			
Dornier Do 17K							70	
Farman F.222.2/F.223				25				
LeO 45				452				
LWS-6 Żubr						17		
Bloch MB.131				143				
Bloch MB.174/175				79				
Bloch MB.210				298				
Potez 633				55				
PZL.37						120		
PZL.43						54 (Note: All but 5 delivered to Bulgaria.)		
PZL.46						2 (Note: Prototypes that were used in combat.)		
Rogožarski SIM-XIV-H							19	
Fokker T.V					16			
Fokker T.VIII					36			
Total	18	144		1,132	105	193	89	1,681

=== Aircraft - Axis - All ===
Occupied countries produced weapons for the Axis powers. Figures are for the period of occupation only.

Axis aircraft production
Fighters	Belgium	Bulgaria	Czech	Netherlands	Finland	France	Germany	Hungary	Italy	Japan	Poland	Romania	Yugoslavia	Total
Mitsubishi A6M Zero										10,939				
Nakajima A6M2-N										327				
Arado Ar 240							14							
Avia B-135			12											
Avia B-534			78											
Bachem Ba 349							36 (Note: Never entered service)							
Messerschmitt Bf 109							33,142	309						33,984
Messerschmitt Bf 110							6,170							6,170
Macchi C.200/Macchi C.202/Macchi C.205									2,766					
Fiat CR.25									12					
Fiat CR.42									1,782					
Dewoitine D.520 (Note: Number refers to production resumed after German occupation.)						440								
Dornier Do 17Z-7/Z-10							12							
Dornier Do 335							37							
Caproni Vizzola F.5									14					
Koolhoven F.K.52				6										
Focke-Wulf Fw 190							20,000							
Fiat G.50 Freccia									666					
Fiat G.55 Centauro									305					
Heinkel He 100 (Note: Produced shortly before the war and mainly used for testing and propaganda purposes.)							25							
Heinkel He 112							60							
Heinkel He 162							320							
Heinkel He 219							300							
IAR 80												346		
Nakajima J1N										479				
Mitsubishi J2M										621				
Kawasaki Ki-10										283				
Nakajima Ki-27										3,399				
Nakajima Ki-43										5,919				
Nakajima Ki-44										1,227				
Kawasaki Ki-45										1,701				
Kawasaki Ki-61										3,159				
Nakajima Ki-84										3,514				
Kawasaki Ki-100										395				
Bloch MB.150						35								
Messerschmitt Me 163 /Mitsubishi J8M							370			7				377
Messerschmitt Me 262							1,433							
Mörkö-Morane (Note: Conversion from MS.406/410.)					41									
Morane-Saulnier MS.410 (Note: Conversion from MS.406.)						74								
Kawanishi N1K										1,435				
PZL P.24											25	25		50
Reggiane Re.2000, 2001, 2002 & 2005								204	531					735
IMAM Ro.44									35					
IMAM Ro.57									75					
Ambrosini SAI.207									14					
Focke-Wulf Ta 152 & Focke-Wulf Ta 154							200							these are unrelated types.
VL Myrsky					51									
VL Pyry					41									
Total			90	6	133	549	62,116	513	6,200	33,405	25	371		96,551
Attack	Belgium	Bulgaria	Czech	Netherlands	Finland	France	Germany	Hungary	Italy	Japan	Poland	Romania	Yugoslavia	
Nakajima B5N										1,149				
Nakajima B6N										1,268				
Aichi B7A										114				
Breda Ba.65									218					
Breda Ba.88									149					
Aichi D3A										1,486				
Yokosuka D4Y										2,038				
CANSA FC.12									11					
CANSA FC.20									6					
Heinkel He 115							138							
Heinkel He 118 (Note: Produced before the war and 2 used by Japanese for testing.)							15							
Henschel Hs 123 (Note: All produced before the war, but used until 1944.)							250							
Henschel Hs 129							865							
Junkers Ju 87 Stuka							6,500							
Mitsubishi Ki-51										2,385				
Kawasaki Ki-102										238				
Aichi M6A										28				
Messerschmitt Me 210 (Note: Only 90 German-built Me 210 were completed and delivered, about 100 Hungarian-built were supplied to Germany)							400	272						672
Messerschmitt Me 410 (Note: Also used as a fighter and for reconnaissance)							1,189							
Yokosuka MXY7										852				
Fiat RS.14									188					
Savoia-Marchetti SM.85									34					
Total							9,092	272	606	9,558				30,903
Bombers	Belgium	Bulgaria	Czech	Netherlands	Finland	France	Germany	Hungary	Italy	Japan	Poland	Romania	Yugoslavia	
Aero A.304			4											
Arado Ar 234							210							
Bloch MB.174/175 (Note: Produced for Germany after German occupation.)						38								
Fiat BR.20 Cicogna									602					
Caproni Ca.135									140					
Caproni Ca.309-314									1,516					
Dornier Do 22							30							
Dornier Do 17E/F							405							
Dornier Do 17K							14							
Dornier Do 17M/P/R/S/U							448							
Dornier Do 17Z							875							
Dornier Do 215							105							
Dornier Do 217							1,025							
Fieseler Fi 167							14							
Focke-Wulf Fw 200							276							
Mitsubishi G3M										1,048				
Mitsubishi G4M										2,435				
Heinkel He 111							7,300							
Heinkel He 177							1,190							
IAR 37												380		
Junkers Ju 88/188/388							16,517							
Kaproni-Bulgarski KB.6		24												
Mitsubishi Ki-21										2,064				
Mitsubishi Ki-30										704				
Kawasaki Ki-32										854				
Kawasaki Ki-48										1,997				
Nakajima Ki-49										819				
Mitsubishi Ki-67/Mitsubishi Ki-109										767				
LeO 45						162								
Piaggio P.108								35						
Yokosuka P1Y										1,102				
Kyushu Q1W										153				
Letov Š-328			80											
Savoia-Marchetti SM.79									1,350			64		
Savoia-Marchetti SM.82 (Note: Only bomber versions listed here.)									379					
Savoia-Marchetti SM.84									246					
Weiss WM-21								128						
CANT Z.506B									320					
CANT Z.1007									660					
CANT Z.1018									15					
Total		24	84			200	28,409	128	5,263	11,943		380		44,802

=== Wartime Production: Canada ===
Canadian military production increased dramatically throughout the duration of World War 2. These include things like: trucks, tanks, airplanes, naval vessels, etc.

Type of Equipment	Equipment Name	Number Produced	Notes
Transportation	Trucks	800,000+	The majority of these trucks were built under the Canadian Military Pattern truck program. 168,000 were used by the Canadian military. 38% or 304,000 were used by the British military. The remaining 328,000 went to the Soviet Union and other allies. Canada produced more trucks throughout the war than Germany, Italy, and Japan combined.
Armour	Tanks	50,000	
Large Calibre Guns	Anti-air, naval guns, field guns.	40,000	
Small Calibre Guns	Pistols, rifles, machine guns, etc.	1,700,000	
Winter Transportation	Snowmobiles	450	
Large Calibre Guns - SP	Sexton 25 lb Self Propelled Guns	2,150	
Light Transportation	4x4 Trucks	4,000	Light duty transportation on a 4x4 chassis. Used for ambulances, personnel carriers, etc.
Merchant Marine	10,000 ton transportation vessels	348	Park class of ships.
Corvette Class	Flower class corvette	???	
Aircraft	Various types of airplanes		10,000 planes sent to the UK. The remainder are split between the Commonwealth Air Training Program and the US Civilian Pilot Training Program (CPTP)

== Propaganda posters ==
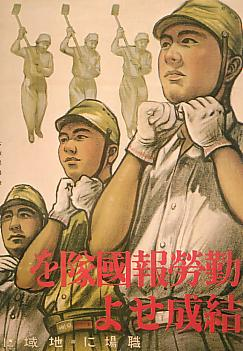
Japanese Organized Labour Service Corps poster

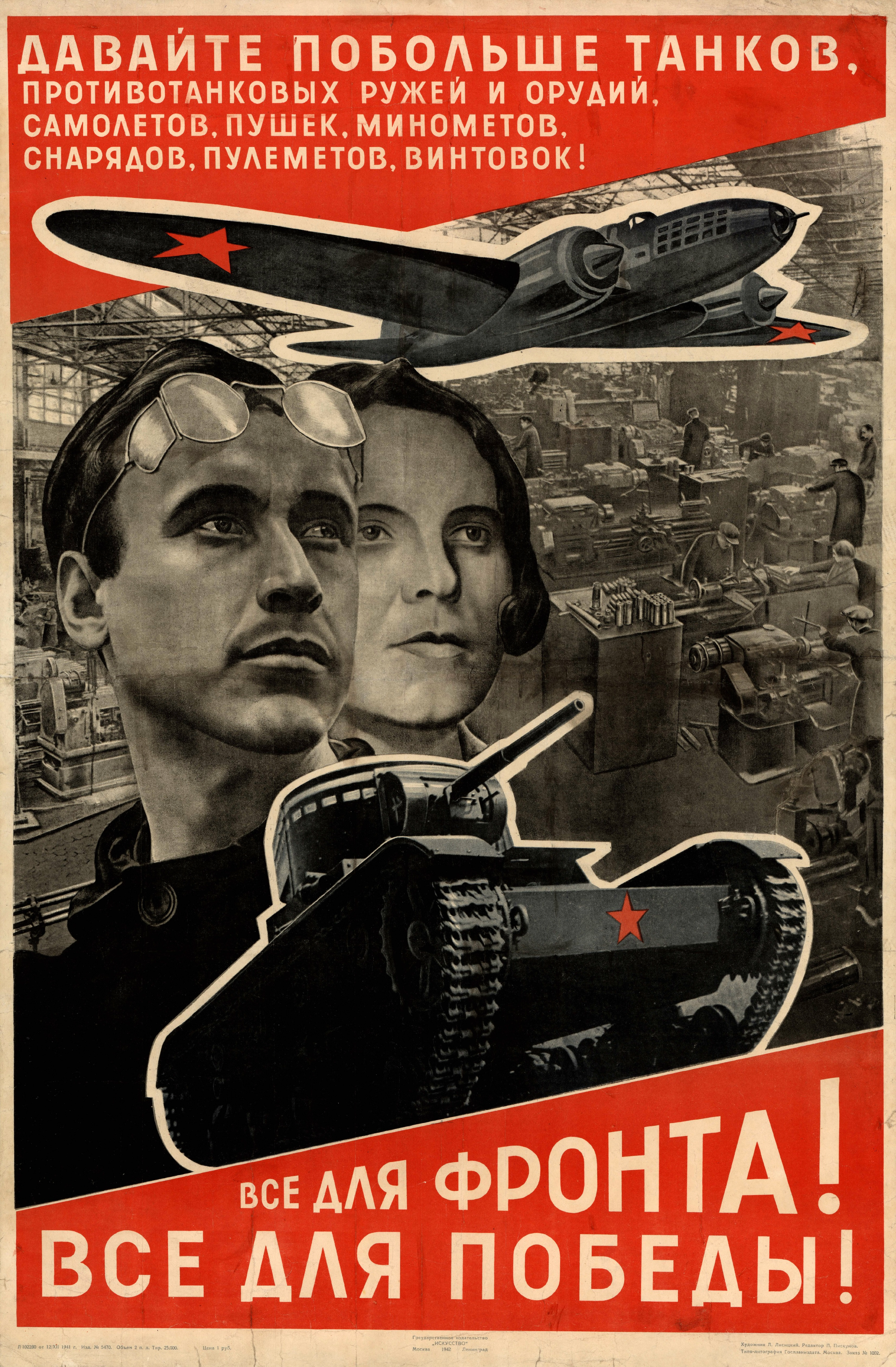
USSR: "Everything for the Front. Everything for Victory"

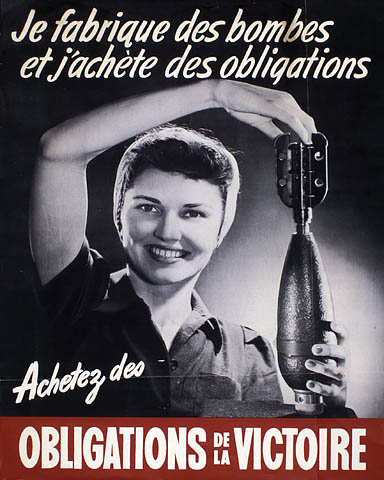
French-Canadian poster: "I'm making bombs and buying bonds!-Buy Victory Bonds."

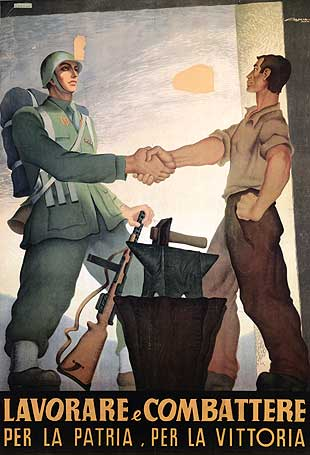
Italy: "Work and Fight for your Country and Victory"

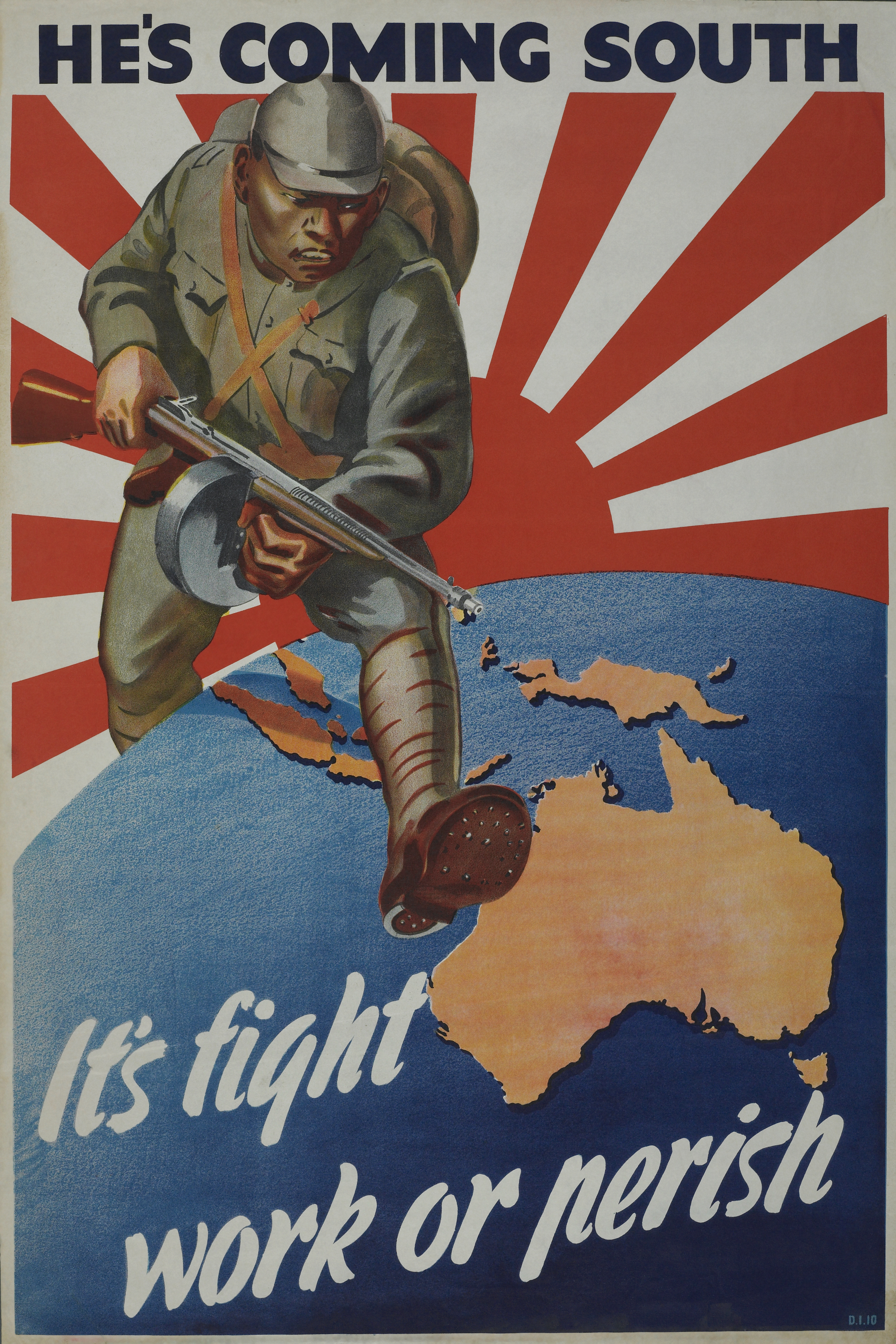
Australia: "He's coming south—it's fight, work or perish"

== See also ==
- Allied technological cooperation during World War II
- Combined Food Board
- Combined Munitions Assignments Board
- Combined Raw Materials Board
- Combined Shipping Adjustment Board
- War Production Board
- American armored fighting vehicle production during World War II
- British armoured fighting vehicle production during World War II
- German armored fighting vehicle production during World War II
- Soviet industry in World War II
  - Soviet armored fighting vehicle production during World War II
- United States aircraft production during World War II
- Forced labour under German rule during World War II
- Technology during World War II

== Notes and References ==
=== Table data ===
==== Personnel -Allied - British Empire ====
- "EMBARKATION FOR SERVICE OUTSIDE AUSTRALIA" and "BATTLE CASUALTIES: AUSTRALIAN SERVICES, WAR OF 1939-1945" Australian War Memorial - via Wayback Machine
- "Facts & Information" Canada at War July 4, 2009 - via Wayback Machine
- Colonel C.P. Stacey. "Chapter XIX Conclusion: Repatriation and Demoblization". The Canadian Army 1939-1945: An Official Historical Summary – via hyperwar.
- Daniel Owen Spence. Imperial Loyalties, 'Imagined Communities' and 'Britishness': The Royal Navy and the Cayman Islands.
- Sherwood, Marika (30 March 2011). Colonies, Colonials and World War Two. BBC History.
- Gillespie, Oliver A. (1952). "I: New Zealand's Responsibility" The Pacific. The Official History of New Zealand in the Second World War 1939–1945. Wellington: Historical Publications Branch.
- The Royal Indian Navy (Appendix 12) – via HyperWar Foundation.
- "Officers Database FAQ". bharat-rakshak.com.
- India 3 idsa.in "Contribution of the Indian Armed Forces in the Second World War"
- "India Pioneers". defencejournal.com. Archived from the original on 2005-09-01.
- "India RIAF". WWII Peoples War. BBC.
- The Battle for Miri and Sarawak, Borneo, WW II (article) by Franz L Kessler on AuthorsDen Malay
- The Allied Merchant Navy - Their Legacy… Our Freedom
- "The Dutch Contribution To the defence of Australia during The War in the Pacific 1941-1945"
- Verheijke, Emma, ed. (14 July 2014). Broome: 3 March 1942 – 3 March 2021 (PDF). Embassy of the Kingdom of the Netherlands, Canberra. Archived from the original (PDF) on 14 July 2014. Netherlands
- "Newfoundland In Two World Wars" - via Wayback Machine
- The Official History of New Zealand in the Second World War 1939–1945. NZETC. New Zealand
- West African Frontier (WAFF) Nigeria - via Wayback Machine
- Saunders, Hilary St. George (1954). "Volume III The Fight Is Won". Royal Air Force 1939-1945. London: HMSO – via Hyperwar Foundation.
- South African Military History Society - Journal - The South African Corps of Marines South Africa
- Flying High: The Story of the Women's Auxiliary Air Force 1939-1945 - South African Military History Society - Journal South Africa
- History. South Africa Navy.
- Martin Plaut (11 March 2014). African troops who fought in World War Two. Martin Plaut.
- "West Africa". fpif.org. 6 June 2012.
- "West Africa". country-data.com.
- "Fact File : Commonwealth and Allied Forces". WWII Peoples War. BBC.

==== Personnel - Axis ====
- The Latvian Squadrons in the Luftwaffe. Latvianaviation.com.
- Volunteers, Ailsby 2004

=== Raw materials ===
- The Mineral Industry of the British Empire and Foreign Countries, Statistical Summary 1938–1944, The Imperial Institute, HMSO, 1948
- The Mineral Industry of the British Empire and Foreign Countries, Statistical Summary 1941–1947, The Imperial Institute, HMSO, 1949

=== Official histories ===
- History of the Second World War (104 volumes), Her Majesty's Stationery Office, London 1949 to 1993
- Official History of Australia in the War of 1939–1945 (22 volumes), Australian Government Printing Service, 1952 to 1977
- Official History of the Canadian Army in the Second World War, Vol I Six Years of War, Stacey, C P., Queen's Printer, Ottawa, 1955
- Official History of the Indian Armed Forces in the Second World War 1939-45 (24 volumes), Combined Inter-Services Historical Section, India & Pakistan, New Delhi, 1956-1966
- Official History of New Zealand in the Second World War 1939–45, Historical Publications Branch, Wellington, New Zealand, 1965
- "U.S. Army in World War II" (78 volumes).

=== Bibliography ===
- Ailsby, Christopher, Hitler's Renegades: Foreign Nationals in the Service of the Third Reich (Photographic Histories), Potomac Books, 2004
- Barnett, Correlli, The audit of war : the illusion & reality of Britain as a great nation, Macmillan, 1986
- Barnes, C.H.; James D.N. Shorts Aircraft since 1900, London, Putnam, 1989
- Bishop, Chris, The Encyclopaedia of Weapons of World War II, Sterling Publishing, 2002
- Bowyer, Michael J.F. Aircraft for the Royal Air Force: The "Griffon" Spitfire, The Albemarle Bomber and the Shetland Flying-Boat, London, Faber & Faber, 1980
- Boyd, David, (2009) "Wartime Production by the Commonwealth during WWII" British Equipment of the Second World War
- Boyd, David (2009). "British Production of Aircraft By Year During The Second World War". British Equipment of the Second World War.
- Butler, Tony. British Secret Projects: Fighters and Bombers 1935–1950. Hinckley, UK: Midland Publishing, 2004
- Canada at War, "The Canadian War Industry"
- Dressel, Joachim and Manfred Griehl. Bombers of the Luftwaffe. London: DAG Publications, 1994
- Flint, Keith, Airborne Armour: Tetrarch, Locust, Hamilcar and the 6th Airborne Armoured Reconnaissance Regiment 1938-1950. Helion & Company Ltd., 2006
- Francillon, René J., Japanese Aircraft of the Pacific War, London, Putnam, 1970
- Gregg, W.A., ed., Canada’s Fighting Vehicles Europe 1943-1945, Canadian Military Historical Society, 1980
- Green, William. War Planes of The Second World War: Volume Seven - Bombers and Reconnaissance Aircraft. London: Macdonald, 1967
- Harrison, Mark, ed., The Economics of World War II: Six Great Powers in International Comparison, Cambridge University Press, 1998
- Herman, Arthur. Freedom's Forge: How American Business Produced Victory in World War II, Random House, New York, 2012
- The Illustrated Encyclopedia of Aircraft (Part Work 1982–1985). London: Orbis Publishing, 1985
- Jackson, A.J., de Havilland Aircraft since 1909 (Third ed.), London, Putnam, 1987
- Jane's Fighting Aircraft of World War II, London, Studio Editions Ltd, 1989
- "Les luxembourgeois de la Brigade Piron". (in French) Armee.lu. Retrieved 29 June 2013
- Long, Jason, Lend Lease as a Function of the Soviet war Economy, sturmvogel.orbat.com, Retrieved June 12, 2014
- Mason, Francis K. The British Bomber since 1914, London: Putnam Aeronautical Books, 1994
- Milward, Alan S., War, economy, and society, 1939-1945, University of California Press, 1979
- Morgan, Eric B. "Albemarle" in Twentyfirst Profile, Volume 1, No. 11. New Milton, Hants, UK: 21st Profile Ltd.
- Munoz, A.J., For Croatia and Christ: The Croatian Army in World War II 1941–1945, Axis Europa Books, NY, 1996
- Mondey, David. The Concise Guide to Axis Aircraft of World War II. New York: Bounty Books, 1996
- Ness, Leland, Jane's World War II Tanks and Fighting Vehicles, The Complete Guide, HarperCollins, 2002
- Otway, Lieutenant-Colonel T.B.H. The Second World War 1939-1945 Army: Airborne Forces. London: Imperial War Museum, 1990
- Overy, Richard, Why the Allies Won (Paperback), W. W. Norton & Company, 1997
- Parker, Dana T. Building Victory: Aircraft Manufacturing in the Los Angeles Area in World War II, Cypress, CA, 2013. ISBN 978-0-9897906-0-4
- Scientia Militaria, South African Journal of Military Studies
- Smith, J.R. and Anthony L. Kay. German Aircraft of the Second World War. London: Putnam and Company Ltd.,
- Strategic Bombing Survey (1945). The Effects of Strategic Bombing on the German War Economy. Overall Economic Effects Division. Washington, D.C.: United States Department of War. hdl:2027/mdp.39015017684799. OCLC 34592087. OL 52990082M. Wikidata Q133728939.
- Swanborough, Gordon. British Aircraft at War, 1939-1945. East Sussex, UK: HPC Publishing, 1997
- Tapper, Oliver. Armstrong Whitworth Aircraft since 1913. London: Putnam, 1988
- Tomasevich, Jozo, War and Revolution in Yugoslavia, 1941–1945: Occupation and Collaboration 2. San Francisco: Stanford University Press, 2001
- Veterans Affairs Canada, "Canadian Production of War Materials"
- Wilson, Stewart, Aircraft of WWII, 1998
- Wrynn, V. Dennis. Forge of Freedom: American Aircraft Production in World War II, Motorbooks International, Osceola, WI, 1995
- Zuljan, Ralph, "Allied and Axis GDP" Articles On War OnWar.com (2003)
