= Combined Munitions Assignments Board =

World War II U.S.-British government agency

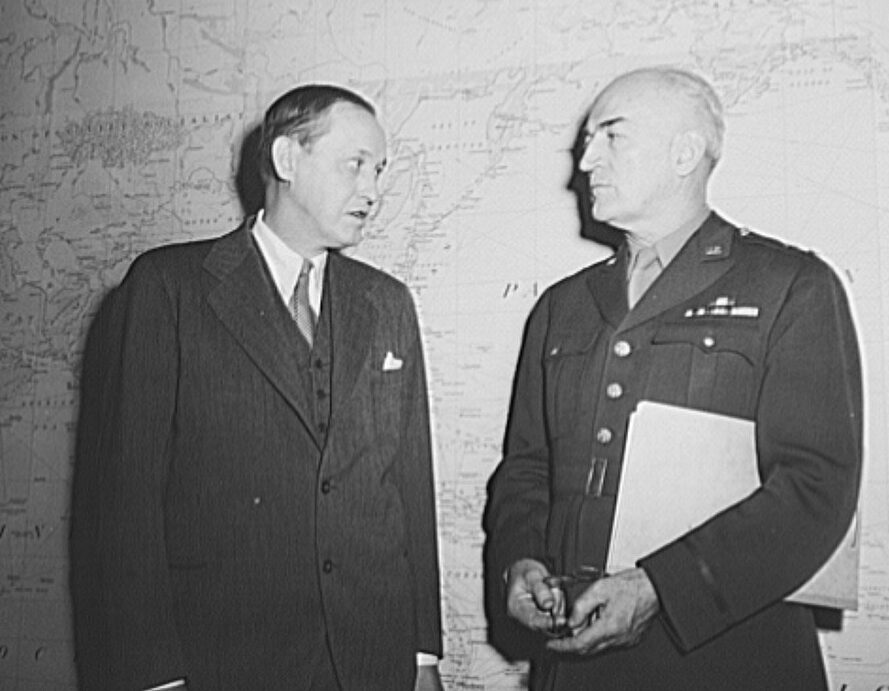
Harry Hopkins, Chairman of the Munitions Assignments Board, confers with MG J.H. Burns, executive officer of the board, Feb. 1943

The Combined Munitions Assignments Board was a major government agency for the U.S. and Britain in World War II. With Harry Hopkins, Roosevelt's top advisor in charge, it took control of the allocation of war supplies and Lend lease aid to the Allies, especially Britain and the Soviet Union.

Churchill's original plan called for two offices for the Board, one in London which he controlled, and one in Washington under Harry Hopkins. The US Army strongly protested, and insisted that the board be under the control of the Combined Chiefs of Staff, the body that brought together the top American and British military commanders. General George C. Marshall, US Army Chief of Staff, argued that the distribution of munitions was so essential to military strategy, that it could never be left to civilians. His argument won out. Hopkins became the head of the Board, but he always saw his role as subordinate to the Combined Chiefs.

Canada asked for a seat on the Board; it was refused but was given a seat on other, much less powerful combined boards.

President Franklin D. Roosevelt and Prime Minister Winston Churchill set it up in January 1942 with a threefold mission:

1. The entire munitions resources of Great Britain and the United States will be deemed to be in a common pool, about which the fullest information will be interchanged.
2. Committees will be formed in Washington and London under the combined Chiefs of Staff in a manner similar to the S.W. Pacific agreement. These committees will advise on all assignments both in quality and priority, whether to Great Britain and the United States or other of the united nations, in accordance with strategic needs.

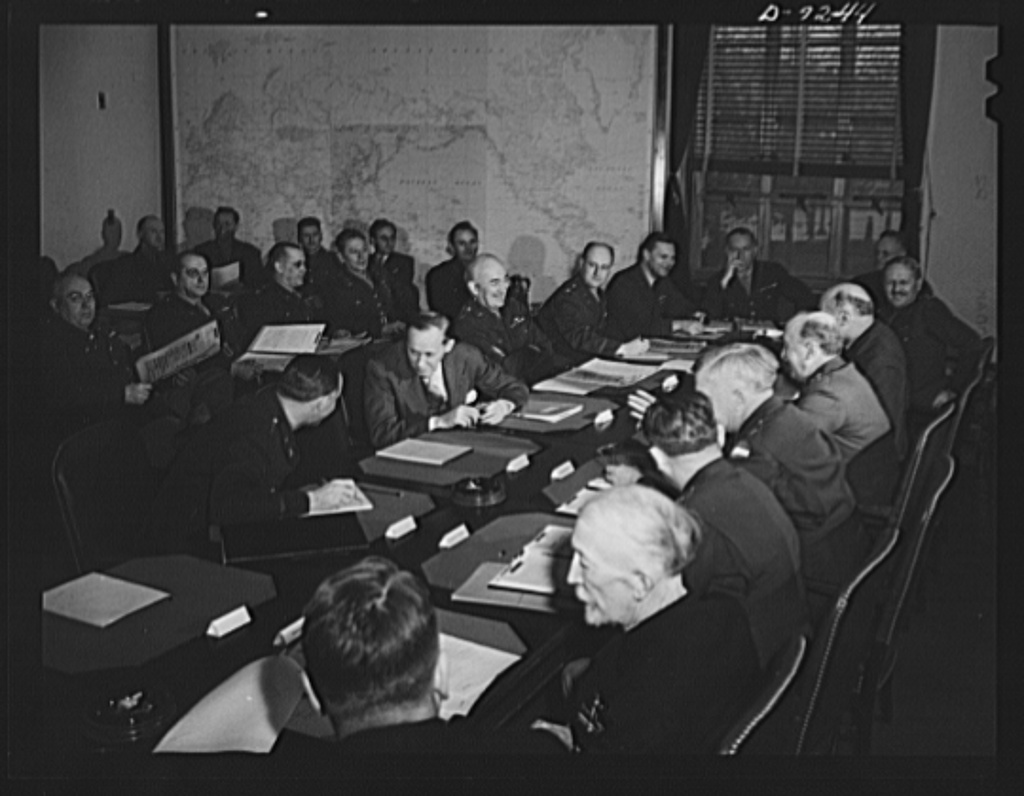
A meeting of the Combined Munitions Assignments Board in February 1943.

3. In order that these committees may be fully apprised of the policy of their respective Governments, the President will nominate a civil chairman, who will preside over the committee in Washington, and the Prime Minister will make a similar nomination in respect of the committee in London. In each case the committee will be assisted by a secretariat capable of surveying every branch and keeping in touch with the work of every sub-committee as may be necessary.

== See also ==
- Combined Food Board
- Combined Raw Materials Board
- Combined Production and Resources Board
- Combined Shipping Adjustment Board
- Military production during World War II
