= Miles Kestrel =

Private venture aircraft developed into the Miles Master

Kestrel
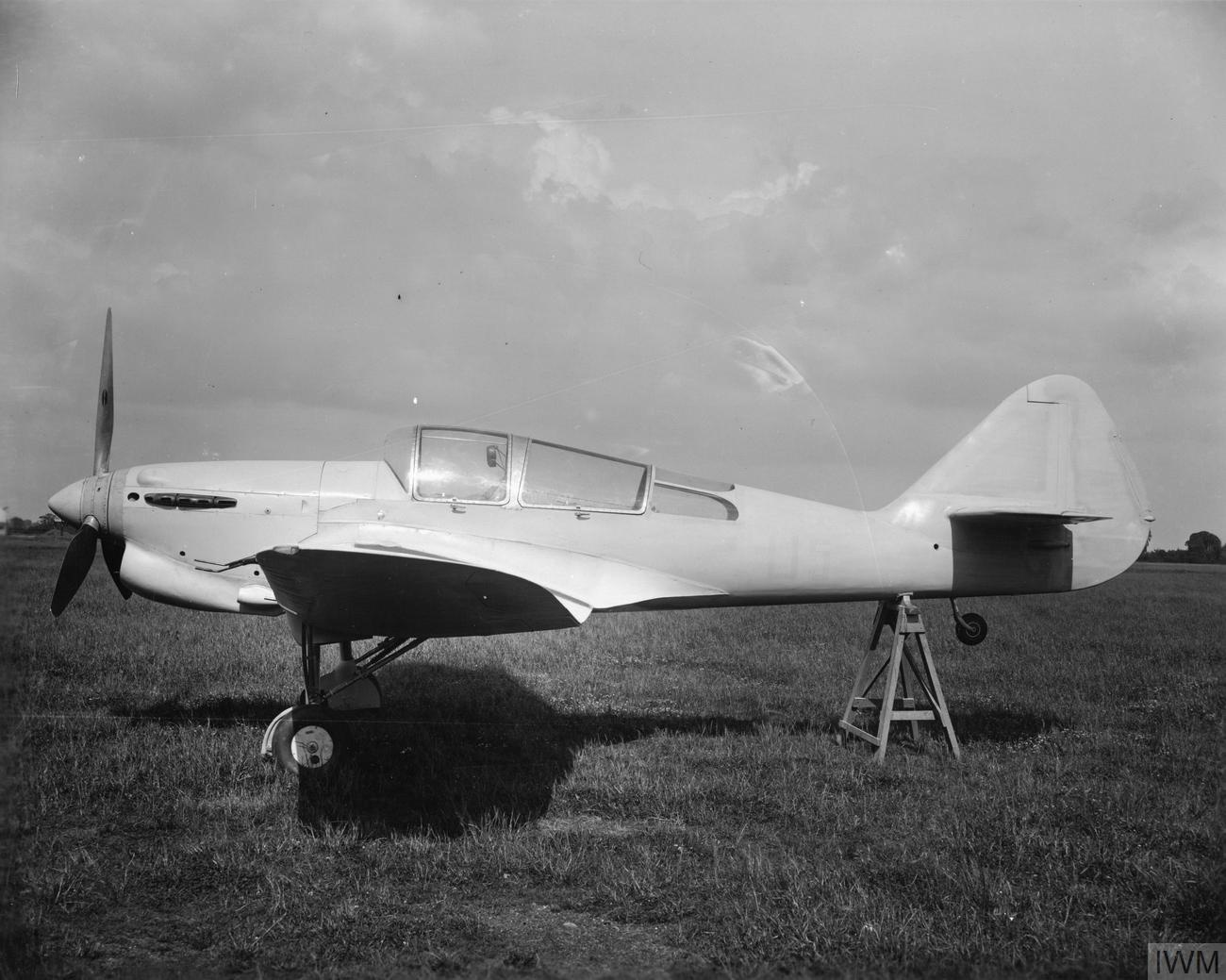

General information
- Type: Advanced trainer
- National origin: United Kingdom
- Manufacturer: Phillips and Powis Aircraft Ltd
- Designer: F. G. Miles
- Number built: 1

History
- First flight: May 1937
- Retired: August 1941
- Variant: Miles Master

The Miles M.9 Kestrel was a 1930s British single-engined tandem seat monoplane, intended as an advanced trainer. Only one Kestrel was built but it was developed into the Miles Master for the RAF and produced in large numbers at the start of the Second World War.

== Design and development ==
The Kestrel was Miles' first high powered aircraft and was an aerodynamically clean monoplane with cantilever wings and tailplane. It is not recorded whether it was named after a bird of prey, like many aircraft designed by F. G. Miles, or after its Rolls-Royce Kestrel engine.

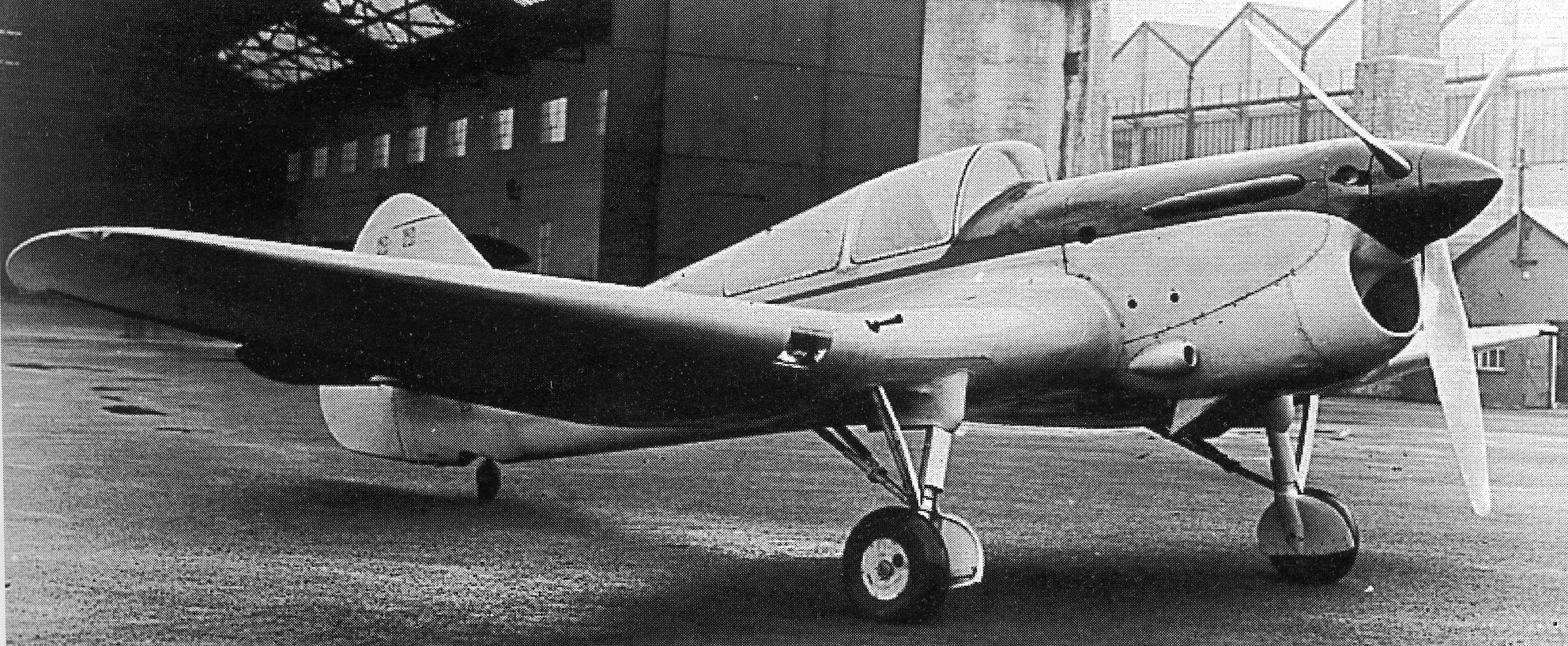
Kestrel U-5 in 1938

The Kestrel had thick wings, perhaps influenced by the experiments with the Miles Hawcon, with a root thickness to chord ratio of about 23%. They had inverted gull form, with anhedral inboard, giving way to dihedral on the outer part. The wings carried ailerons immediately outboard of Miles split trailing edge flaps in two sections on each wing. The main undercarriage was attached at the lowest point of the wing, keeping the legs short; they retracted backwards, with the wheels rotating into the plane of the wings. A tail wheel was fitted. Both rudder and elevators were horn balanced and fitted with trim tabs.

The aircraft was wooden throughout, with spruce frames covered in beech ply and a doped fabric sheath. Instructor and pupil sat in tandem under a simple perspex canopy, with the minimum of framing and with extra clear panels in the fuselage sides behind the rear seat. The forward seat was positioned at about mid-chord. The 745 hp (556 kW) Kestrel engine drove a three-bladed propeller and had a chin radiator under the nose.

== Operational history ==
The sole Kestrel (G-AEOC) was built as a private venture, and first flew in May 1937. On 26 June 1937, it appeared at the RAF Hendon display. Its performance was remarkable for a trainer; it reached 295 mph (475 km/h) at 14,000 ft (4,270 m), only 15 mph slower than the contemporary single-seat Hawker Hurricane with its much more powerful engine. The Kestrel did not carry the same military load, though there was provision for a single 0.303 in (7.7 mm) Browning machine gun in the starboard wing outboard of the landing gear, and for a camera in the matching port side position. There is no record that this gun was fitted. There was also provision for eight practice bombs on two centre section racks.

After the Hendon event, it flew on manufacturer's trials, under B conditions (in Class B markings) as U-5, until it was transferred to military markings as N3300. It was test flown at the Royal Aircraft Establishment at Farnborough, and by the Aeroplane & Armament Experimental Establishment at Boscombe Down. On 20 August 1941, it was struck off RAF charge, and in 1943 was scrapped at the Miles base at Woodley Aerodrome.

The Kestrel had not been built to an Air Ministry specification, and did not immediately go into production, being described by some as "premature". However, in 1938, the de Havilland Don, that had won the Air Ministry specification T.6/36 contract, proved unsuitable in service, so orders were placed for a production development of the Kestrel called the Miles Master. At the time, it was the largest ever order for an RAF training aircraft. The Master I had some noticeable differences from the Kestrel, such as in the shape of the rear fuselage and fin, the rudder and elevator balancing, the cockpit glazing, and the relocation of the radiator from nose to belly, but was otherwise very similar.

== Specifications ==
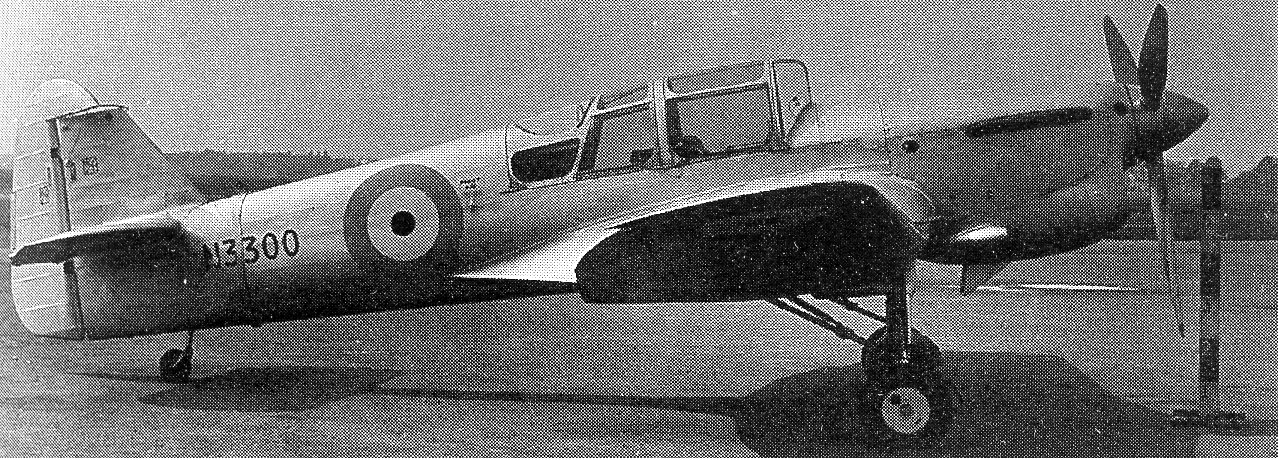
Kestrel in RAF markings, N3300, February 1939

Data from Lukins & Russell 1945, p. 40.

General characteristics

- Crew: 2
- Length: 29 ft 6 in (8.99 m)
- Wingspan: 39 ft 0 in (11.88 m)
- Height: 9 ft 5 in (2.87 m)
- Wing area: 235 sq ft (21.8 m^{2})
- Empty weight: 4,159 lb (1,886 kg)
- Gross weight: 5,337 lb (2,421 kg)
- Powerplant: 1 × Rolls-Royce Kestrel XVI liquid cooled V-12 , 745 hp (556 kW)

Performance

- Maximum speed: 296 mph (475 km/h, 257 kn) at 14,000 ft (4,270 m)
- Cruise speed: 245 mph (394 km/h, 213 kn)

Armament

- Provision for one 0.303 in (7.7 mm) Browning machine gun
