= Combined Production and Resources Board =

World War II U.S.-British government agency

The Combined Production and Resources Board was a temporary World War II government agency that allocated the combined economic resources of the United States and Britain. It was set up by President Franklin D. Roosevelt and Prime Minister Winston Churchill on June 9, 1942. Canada, after insisting on its economic importance, was given a place on the board in November, 1942. The Board closed down at the end of December 1945.

== Mission ==
The mission of the Board set out by Roosevelt and Churchill was twofold:

- a) Combine the production programmes of the U.S. and the U.K. into a single integrated programme, adjusted to the strategic requirements of the war, as indicated to the Board by the Combined Chiefs of Staff, and to all relevant production factors. In this connection the Board shall take account of the need for maximum utilisation of the productive resources available to the United States, the British Commonwealth, and the United Nations, the need to reduce demands on shipping to a minimum, and the essential needs of the civilian populations.
- b. In close collaboration with the Combined Chiefs of Staff, assure the continuous adjustment of the combined production programme to meet changing military requirements.

== Jurisdiction ==
The Board was charged by the Combined Chiefs of Staff to take all relevant production factors into account, for the maximum utilization of the productive resources available to the United States, Britain and its Commonwealth, and the United Nations at war. It was disbanded at the end of the war. The Board fought jurisdictional battles with a comparable agency, the Combined Munitions Assignment Board, which was part of the Combined Chiefs of Staff (which had its British and American branches). The American side was chaired by Roosevelt's top aide Harry Hopkins. The British usually favored the Board, while the Americans favored the Agency.

== Impact ==
The need for the Combined Production and Resources Board was underscored in 1942 when it called on the War Department for details on the material requirements of the Army (including the Air Force) for the next 18 months. Each unit in the War Department had been accustomed to ordering directly from industry, giving out high priorities based on rough estimates, with no coordination or overall picture. Some 28,000 man-hours of work analyzed 17,000 items of procurement, and discovered what would be needed and when. The result was revolutionary, as haphazard methods gave way to systematic statistical results, broken down quarterly, that showed what the Army would purchase in terms of production, construction, and maintenance.

It coordinated activity with two similar combined boards, the Combined Food Board and the Combined Raw Materials Board.

Political scientists who have studied the Board say that on the whole it was ineffective. The official history of the War Production Board says the CPRB "never realized" its opportunity:

Despite early efforts, CPRB did not engage in comprehensive production planning or in the long-term strategic planning of economic resources. The American and British production programs for 1943 were not combined into a single integrated program, adjusted to the strategic requirements of the war. CPRB's isolation from the sources of decision regarding production objectives, its failure to develop an effective organization, its deference to other agencies and its tardiness in asserting its jurisdiction, the inadequacy of program planning by the agencies upon whom CPRB relied for forecasts of requirements, the delay of the Combined Chiefs of Staff in formulating strategic objectives for 1943—all these contributed to a result that saw adjustments in the American and British production programs for 1943 made by the appropriate national authorities in each case, rather than through combined machinery.

== Staff ==
- Donald Nelson of the U.S. chaired the Board.
- Brigadier General Henry Aurand, based in Washington, was the first Chief Executive Officer for the United States
- Milton Katz, based in Washington, in 1942 became the Chief Executive Officer for the United States
- Thomas Brand, based in London, was the Chief Executive Officer on the British side of the Board
- Richard W. B. Clarke was the British representative on the Board in Washington, 1942–43.
- Fred Hall from 1942 to 1944, was an assistant director of the Board.
- C.D. Howe, Canada's Minister of Supply and Munitions, was the Chief Executive Officer for Canada.

== See also ==
- Combined Food Board
- Combined Munitions Assignments Board. the most important board
- Combined Raw Materials Board
- Combined Shipping Adjustment Board
- Military production during World War II
