= Combined Shipping Adjustment Board =

World War II U.S.-British government agency

The Combined Shipping Adjustment Board or Combined Shipping Board was a joint American-British war agency 1942-45 nominally in charge of commercial shipping. It proved ineffective as much more powerful boards, such as the Combined Munitions Assignments Board, ignored it. The U.S. Army and Navy controlled most shipping and refused to share responsibility with the Board as did the powerful War Shipping Administration. For practical purposes the agency was inactive by spring 1943.

President Franklin D. Roosevelt and Prime Minister Winston Churchill set it up in January 1942 with a 6-point mandate:

1. In principle the shipping resources of the two countries will be deemed to be pooled. The fullest information will be interchanged.
2. Owing to the military and physical facts of the situation around the British Isles, the entire movement of shipping now under the control of Great Britain will continue to be directed by the Ministry of War Transport.
3. Similarly, the appropriate authority in the United States will continue to direct the movements and allocations of U.S. shipping or shipping of other Powers under U.S. control.
4. In order to adjust and concert in one harmonious policy the work of the British Ministry of War Transport and the shipping authorities of the U.S. Government, there wilt be established forthwith in Washington a Combined Shipping Adjustment Board consisting of a representative of the United States and a representative of the British Government who will represent and act under the instructions of the British Minister of War Transport.
5. A similar Adjustment Board will be set up in London consisting of the Minister of War Transport and a representative of the U.S. Government.
6. In both cases the executive power will be exercised solely by the appropriate shipping agency in Washington and by the Minister of War Transport in London.

== See also ==
- Combined Food Board
- Combined Munitions Assignments Board. the most important board
- Combined Production and Resources Board
- Combined Raw Materials Board
