= Miles Master =

Advanced trainer aircraft in Britain

Master
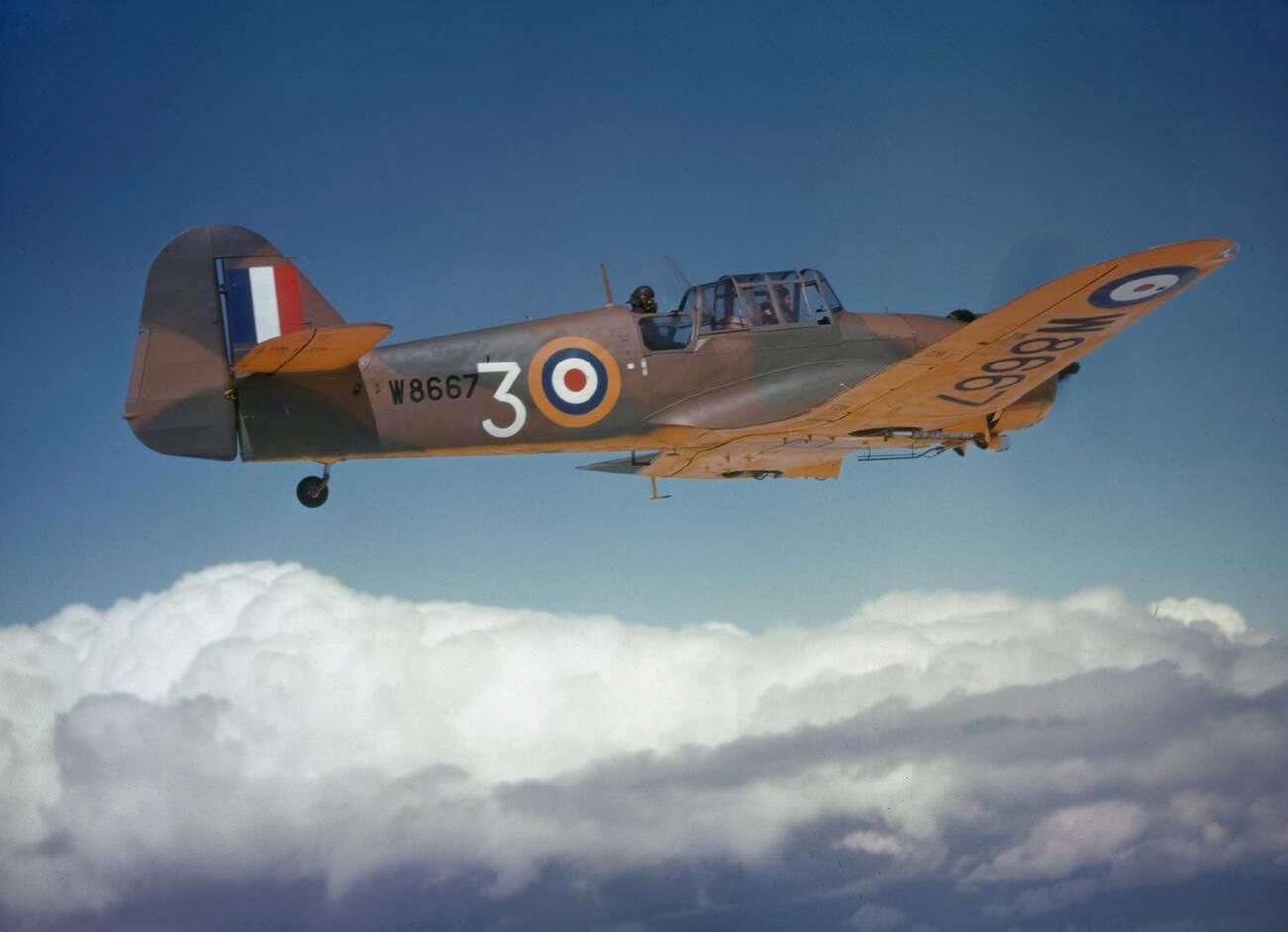
- Master III (serial W8667) of No.5 SFTS

General information
- Type: Advanced trainer
- Manufacturer: Phillips and Powis Aircraft Ltd
- Designer: F. G. Miles
- Status: Out of production, retired
- Primary users: Royal Air Force: Egypt; South African Air Force; Turkey
- Number built: 3,249

History
- Introduction date: 1939
- First flight: 31 March 1939
- Developed from: Miles Kestrel
- Variant: Miles Martinet

The Miles M.9 Master was a British two-seat monoplane advanced trainer designed and built by aviation company Miles Aircraft Ltd. It was inducted in large numbers into both the Royal Air Force (RAF) and Fleet Air Arm (FAA) during the Second World War.

The Master can trace its origins back to the earlier M.9 Kestrel demonstrator aircraft. Following the failure of the rival de Havilland Don as a satisfactory trainer aircraft, the RAF ordered 500 M9A Master advanced trainers to meet its needs. Once in service, it provided a fast, strong and fully aerobatic aircraft that functioned as an excellent introduction to the high performance British fighter aircraft of the day: the Supermarine Spitfire and Hawker Hurricane. Throughout its production life, thousands of aircraft and various variants of the Master were produced, the latter being largely influenced by engine availability. Numerous Masters were modified to enable their use as glider tows. The Master also served as the basis for the Miles Martinet, a dedicated target tug adopted by the RAF.

Perhaps the most radical use of the aircraft was the M.24 Master Fighter. Armed with six 0.303 inch (7.7 mm) machine guns, it was intended for mass production as an emergency fighter during the Battle of Britain; this model did not ultimately see combat. Ordinary trainer models could also be fitted with armaments, including a single .303 in Vickers machine gun and eight bombs, for training purposes only. Beyond the British air services, other nations also chose to adopt the Master, including the South African Air Force, United States Army Air Force, Irish Air Corps, Royal Egyptian Air Force, Turkish Air Force, and the Portuguese Air Force. While thousands of Masters were manufactured, no complete examples have been preserved.

== Development ==
=== Background ===
The M.9A Master I was based on the privately developed M.9 Kestrel trainer that was first demonstrated at the Hendon Air show in July 1937, although this aircraft never entered production. The M.9 Kestrel, powered by a single Rolls-Royce Kestrel XVI V-12 engine, capable of generating up to 745 hp (555 kW), could attain a maximum speed of 296 mph (477 km/h). The British Air Ministry had previously selected the de Havilland Don multi-role trainer (Note: training pilots, radio operators and air gunners (the Don as designed had a dorsal turret)) to meet Specification T.6/36, which called for an advanced trainer aircraft; however, this aircraft would prove to be a failure. Still requiring an aircraft to perform the duties intended for the Don, following the prototype Master (serial N3300) the RAF placed a large order on 11 June 1938 for 500 examples of a modified version of the Kestrel (to specification 16/38), designated M.9A with the service name Master, at a cost of £2 million. This was claimed to be Britain's largest ever contract for a training aircraft at the time.

Upon receipt of this order, Miles had the prototype M.9 rebuilt into a representative prototype for the Master. Alterations included the installation of a lower-powered [715 hp (533 kW)] Kestrel XXX engine, of which there were large surplus stocks available, along with extensive revisions to the airframe, which involved the adoption of a new cockpit canopy, a modified rear fuselage and tail, along with the repositioning of the radiator from underneath the nose to the underside of the wing's centre-section. These modifications came at the cost of a significantly reduced maximum speed over the M.9; despite this, the Master was a relatively fast and manoeuvrable trainer. Miles had designed the Master to fulfil their vision of an effective trainer aircraft, being one that could match the performance of, and possess similar characteristics to, the frontline RAF monoplane fighters of the day, these being the Supermarine Spitfire and the Hawker Hurricane.

=== Into flight ===
On 31 March 1939, the first true production Master I conducted its maiden flight. The first production examples were delivered during late July of that year. The Master had entered RAF service just prior to the start of the Second World War. Eventually, 900 Mk. I and Mk. IA Masters were constructed. This total included 26 built as the M.24 Master Fighter which were modified to a single-seat configuration, and armed with six .303 in machine guns for use as an emergency fighter; this model never saw combat use.

When production of the Kestrel engine ceased, a new variant of the Master was designed that used an air-cooled Bristol Mercury XX radial engine, capable of producing 870 hp (650 kW), instead. Thus configured, on 30 October 1939, the first M.19 Master II prototype made its first flight; 1,748 aircraft were eventually built. After the Lend-Lease programme provided a supply of engines from the United States to Britain, a third variant of the Master, designated M.27 Master III, was designed, which was powered by the American-built Pratt & Whitney Twin Wasp Junior, a two-row radial engine that could generate 825 hp (615 kW). A total of 602 Master IIIs were constructed.

In a typical trainer configuration, the Master was equipped to carry eight practice bombs, plus a single .303 in Vickers machine gun that was mounted in the front fuselage. During 1942, it was decided to have the wings of all variants clipped by three feet (c. one metre); this modification reduced the stress imposed upon the wings while also increasing the aircraft's manoeuvrability.

=== Production ===
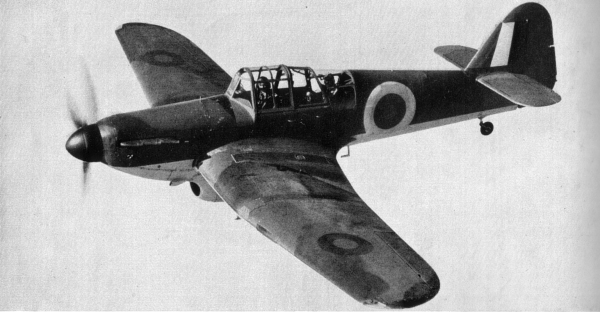
Miles M.9A Master I

A total of 3,249 Masters were built by Phillips and Powis Aircraft Limited (as Miles was known until 1943) at Woodley, Berkshire; South Marston, near Swindon, Wiltshire; and Doncaster. This was the largest number produced of any Miles aircraft type prior to production of the newer Miles Martinet taking precedence during 1942.

The mass production of this aeroplane at Woodley required a major expansion of the original Phillips & Powis factory, which was officially opened on 27 January 1939 by the Secretary of State for Air, Sir Kingsley Wood. This facility was outfitted with a pioneering moving track assembly line, which is believed to be the first such facility in a British aircraft factory. A similar facility was also installed in the company's shadow factory at South Marston by the end of 1940.

== Design ==
The Miles Master was a tandem-seat low-wing cantilever monoplane, powered by a single reciprocating engine. Initial models used the Kestrel XXX engine; capable of providing up to 745 hp (555 kW), this powerplant enabled the aircraft to achieve a maximum speed of 296 mph (477 km/h), which reportedly made the Master as fast as the single-seat biplane fighters of 1935. The inverted gull wing of the Master was a major distinguishing factor of the aircraft and was adopted – despite higher production costs – for its performance benefits, permitting the stowage of both the retractable undercarriage and fuel tanks; aside from this shaping, the wing's design largely conformed with traditional approaches. It featured hydraulically-actuated split flaps along its trailing edge, their position being indicated electronically on the cockpit's instrumentation panel. The wing's centre-section also accommodated a single machine gun.

While the Master had incorporated relatively advanced aerodynamic characteristics (intended to mimic frontline fighters) for a contemporary trainer aircraft, it used a conventional structure, comprising an oval-section fuselage covered by a plywood skin, featuring a semi-monocoque approach. Forward of the tandem cockpits, the nose is strengthened by a metal former that provides protection against nose-overs, a common occurrence amongst trainee pilots when flying aircraft with 'tail dragger' conventional undercarriage. The tail section had an orthodox cantilever structure, the tailplane being mounted directly on top of the fuselage; the tailplane's aerodynamics were designed to facilitate easy spin recovery. The Kestrel engine is mounted on tubular steel bearings, to facilitate engine removal for ease of maintenance through four main bolts along with the connecting leads. Further maintenance savings were made by de-rating the engine power, giving a longer interval between overhauls.

The Master was furnished with a constant-speed propeller, which was interchangeable between Rotol and de Havilland units. The Kestrel engine of early-built aircraft incorporated various auxiliary drives to power both vacuum and hydraulic pumps, along with an air compressor and a 500-watt electrical generator. Cooling for the water and oil systems was provided via a duct running underneath the fuselage. Fuel was housed in a pair of tanks, each containing up to 36 imp gal (160 L), accommodated within the wings; the oil tank is mounted behind a fireproof bulkhead while the water tank is mounted in front of the engine. The retractable undercarriage is operated via two separate hydraulic systems along with a hand-pump as backup; the brakes are also hydraulically actuated.

The cockpit of the Master was designed with considerable attention to best facilitate its use as a trainer aircraft, including for ease of use and comfort. The positions of the two flying crew, the student in front and the instructor behind, was staggered; the rear position was 12 inches higher to provide the instructor with greater visibility. Mid-flight, an instructor could disconnect several of the student pilot's controls, such as the brakes, using various cut-outs. The forward windscreen is composed of moulded Perspex and furnished with a reflector-type gun sight, providing an optically-perfect view of a target. Two small panels could be opened to aid visibility while flying in poor weather conditions, sun blinds were also incorporated. Catches on either side of the sliding canopy allowed for the panels to be rapidly detached, facilitating faster bailing-out during an emergency. Other emergency equipment included a Graviner fire extinguisher mounted behind the rear seat and emergency hydraulic controls set into the floor of the cockpit.

== Operational history ==
Typical service use of the Master primarily revolved around (Pilot) Advanced Flying Units, where they were used for training aircrew in preparation for service with frontline squadrons. Amongst other parts of the training syllabus, pilots would often be first exposed to fighter tactics while flying the aircraft. By 1942, advertisements claimed that the Master was being flown by every RAF fighter pilot-in-training.

Several hundred Master IIs were either delivered in, or subsequently converted to, a configuration that allowed their use in the glider-towing role. Such aircraft would have the lower portion of their rudder cut away to allow fitting of a towing hook. Starting in 1942, Miles Masters were extensively used as tugs for General Aircraft Hotspur gliders at various Glider Training Schools. Examples were also operated by multiple Anti-aircraft Co-operation Units of the RAF as a liaison aircraft with British Army units.

Initially, the type was mainly used for training, thus few aircraft entered squadron service. Known deployments were to No. 287 Squadron between February and August 1942, to No. 286 Squadron from November 1944 to February 1945, and to No. 613 Squadron between August 1941 and October 1943.

The Master II was also used for target tug purposes at the Central Gunnery School whilst the School was based at RAF Sutton Bridge from April 1942 to March 1944. In this role, they pulled the drogue targets required for aerial gunnery training by pupils at the Pilot Gunnery Instructors' Training Wing. The Miles Martinet, a derivative of the Master, was a developed specifically to be a target tug and would see widespread use in this capacity.

RAF stocks were frequently diverted to support several of the air services of the Allies and other non-hostile nations. Such diversions included 426 aircraft to the South African Air Force, 52 to the Fleet Air Arm, nine to the United States Army Air Force units based in Britain, 23 to the Royal Egyptian Air Force, 23 to Turkish Air Force, two to Portuguese Air Force, and fourteen to the Irish Air Corps.

Despite having been produced in the thousands, there are no known surviving aircraft of the type today, although a few outer wings and other parts are held by several aviation museums in Britain.

== Variants ==
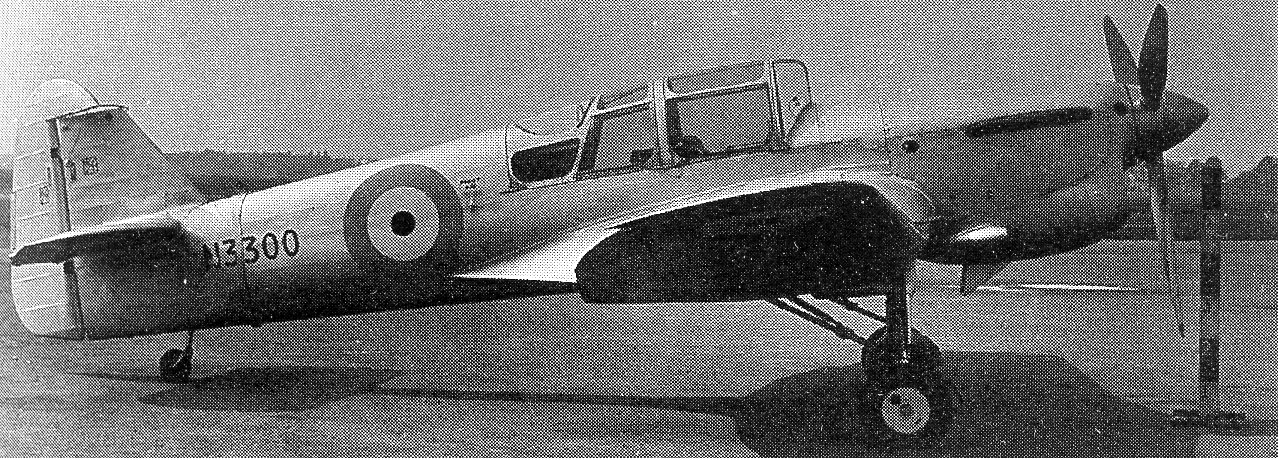
Miles M.9A Master prototype, N3300, February 1939

Miles M.9A Master
The prototype Master (serial number N3300) was modified from the private venture M.9 Kestrel trainer prototype.
Miles M.9B Master I
Initial production of variant of the Master, it was powered by the 720 hp (540 kW) Rolls-Royce Kestrel XXX engine. Maximum speed was 226 mph (196 kn; 364 km/h), ceiling was 27,000 ft (8,200 m) and maximum range was 484 mi (421 nmi; 779 km). The Miles M.9C Master IA was an improved design with more angular windscreen and a wingspan reduced from 39 ft (11.89 m) to 37 ft 7 in (11.46 m) with squared wingtips, all M.9B Master Is were converted to this standard. Production totalled 900 aircraft built at Woodley.

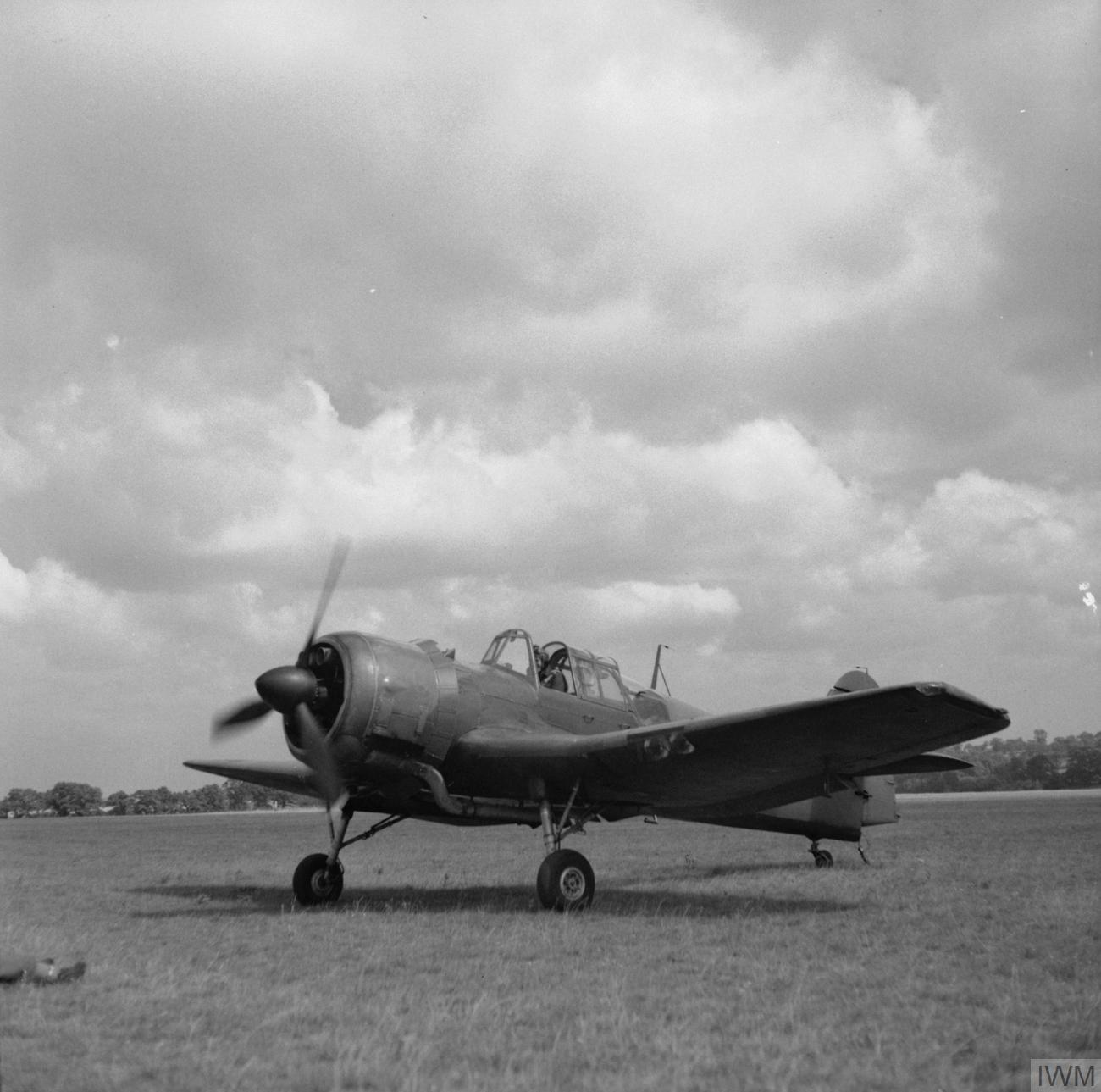
Miles M.19 Master II

Miles M.19 Master II
With supplies of the Kestrel engine dwindling, the Master was re-engined with the 870 hp (650 kW) Bristol Mercury XX, creating the M.19 Master II. Earlier versions had the longer wing while later versions adopted the reduced wingspan. Maximum speed was increased to 242 mph (210 kn; 389 km/h), ceiling was 25,100 ft (7,700 m) and maximum range was 393 mi (342 nmi; 632 km). The Miles M.19 Master GT.II was a version modified as a glider tug, at least 133 conversions were made and 290 Master IIs were built as GT.IIs. Production totalled 1,748 aircraft built at Woodley and South Marston. (Note: At least one and possibly nine aircraft were assembled at Doncaster Airport.)
Miles M.24 Master Fighter
Stop-gap fighter version of Master I with rear seat removed and six 0.303 Browning machine-guns in the wings. 25 conversions of Master Is on the production line.

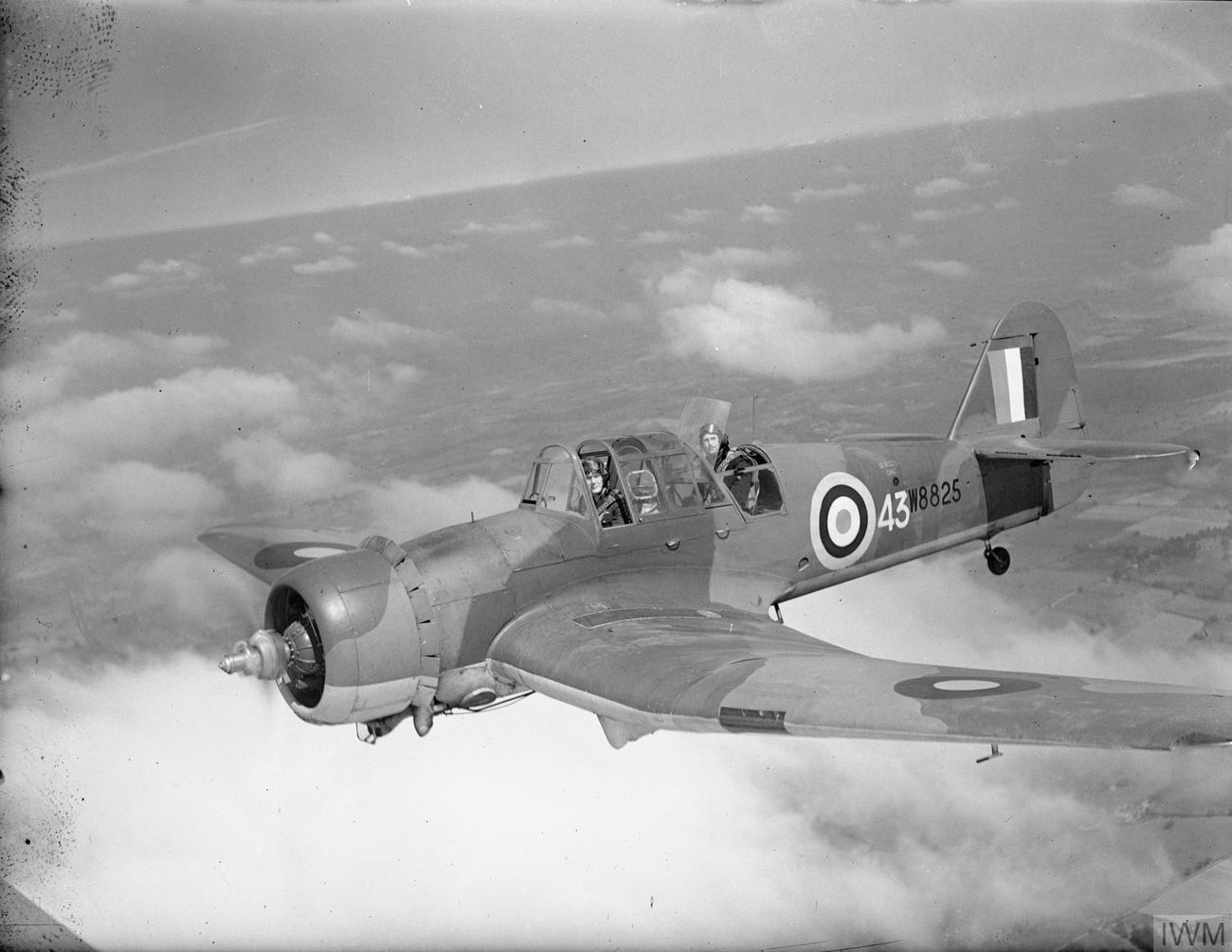
Miles M.27 Master III

Miles M.27 Master III
To overcome shortages of Mercury engines, the 825 hp (615 kW) Pratt & Whitney R-1535 Twin Wasp Junior was fitted to a modified airframe, creating the M.27 Master III. Maximum speed was 232 mph (202 kn; 373 km/h), ceiling was 27,300 ft (8,300 m) and maximum range was 320 mi (280 nmi; 510 km).Production totalled 602 aircraft, all built at South Marston.
Miles M.31 Master IV
Proposed improved design to give the instructor a better field of view, none built. (Note: The fuselage of Master IV was built but then abandoned.)

== Military operators ==
Belgium

- Belgian Air Force

Egypt

- Royal Egyptian Air Force – 26 aircraft supplied in 1944 from RAF stocks

France

- French Air Force

Ireland

- Irish Air Corps – 12 former RAF Master IIs were purchased (six in 1943 and six in 1945),

Portugal

- Portuguese Air Force – 4 former RAF Master IIs were delivered in 1943 and ten Master IIIs delivered from 1941.

South Africa

- South African Air Force – 453 Master IIs were supplied to South Africa (including 25 which were lost at sea and did not arrive).

Turkey

- Turkish Air Force

United Kingdom Royal Air Force operational units

- No. 4 Squadron RAF
- No. 16 Squadron RAF
- No. 25 Squadron RAF
- No. 26 Squadron RAF
- No. 73 Squadron RAF
- No. 85 Squadron RAF
- No. 87 Squadron RAF
- No. 105 Squadron RAF
- No. 140 Squadron RAF
- No. 152 Squadron RAF
- No. 168 Squadron RAF
- No. 219 Squadron RAF
- No. 222 Squadron RAF
- No. 225 Squadron RAF
- No. 238 Squadron RAF
- No. 239 Squadron RAF
- No. 242 Squadron RAF
- No. 245 Squadron RAF
- No. 249 Squadron RAF
- No. 253 Squadron RAF
- No. 257 Squadron RAF
- No. 264 Squadron RAF
- No. 266 Squadron RAF
- No. 286 Squadron RAF
- No. 287 Squadron RAF
- No. 302 Polish Fighter Squadron
- No. 306 Polish Fighter Squadron
- No. 307 Polish Night Fighter Squadron
- No. 308 Polish Fighter Squadron
- No. 414 Squadron RCAF
- No. 460 Squadron RAAF
- No. 504 Squadron RAF
- No. 521 Squadron RAF
- No. 600 Squadron RAF
- No. 607 Squadron RAF
- No. 610 Squadron RAF
- No. 613 Squadron RAF
- No. 615 Squadron RAF
- No. 616 Squadron RAF

RAF training units

- No. 5 Flying Training School RAF
- No. 8 Flying Training School RAF
- No. 9 Flying Training School RAF
- No. 14 Flying Training School RAF
- No. 15 Flying Training School RAF
- No. 6 Operational Training Unit RAF
- No. 41 Operational Training Unit RAF
- No. 52 Operational Training Unit RAF
- No. 53 Operational Training Unit RAF
- No. 55 Operational Training Unit RAF
- No. 56 Operational Training Unit RAF
- No. 57 Operational Training Unit RAF
- No. 58 Operational Training Unit RAF
- No. 60 Operational Training Unit RAF
- No. 61 Operational Training Unit RAF
- Central Flying School

Fleet Air Arm, Royal Navy – about 200 Master Is transferred from the Royal Air Force.

- 748 Naval Air Squadron
- 759 Naval Air Squadron
- 760 Naval Air Squadron
- 761 Naval Air Squadron
- 762 Naval Air Squadron
- 780 Naval Air Squadron
- 781 Naval Air Squadron
- 785 Naval Air Squadron
- 798 Naval Air Squadron

United States

- United States Army Air Forces – 44 Masters were loaned to the USAAF for communications duties and target tugs for use in the United Kingdom.

== Specifications (M.19 Master Mk.II) ==
Data from Miles Aircraft since 1925 and Aircraft of the Royal Air Force since 1918

General characteristics

- Crew: 2
- Length: 29 ft 6 in (8.99 m)
- Wingspan: 39 ft 0 in (11.89 m) initially; 35 ft 7 in (10.85 m) later
- Height: 9 ft 3 in (2.82 m)
- Wing area: 235 sq ft (21.8 m^{2}) initially; 209 sq ft (19.4 m^{2}) later
- Aspect ratio: 6.5
- Airfoil: root: NACA 23024; tip: NACA 23006
- Empty weight: 4,293 lb (1,947 kg)
- Gross weight: 5,573 lb (2,528 kg)
- Fuel capacity: 68 imp gal (82 US gal; 309 L) fuel; 7 imp gal (8 US gal; 32 L) oil
- Powerplant: 1 × Bristol Mercury XX 9-cylinder air-cooled radial piston engine, 870 hp (650 kW)
- Propellers: 3-bladed constant-speed propeller

Performance

- Maximum speed: 242 mph (389 km/h, 210 kn) at 6,000 ft (1,800 m)
- Stall speed: 63 mph (101 km/h, 55 kn) IAS flaps down
- Never exceed speed: 330 mph (530 km/h, 290 kn) IAS
- Range: 393 mi (632 km, 342 nmi)
- Endurance: 1.8 hours
- Service ceiling: 25,100 ft (7,700 m)
- Absolute ceiling: 26,000 ft (7,900 m)
- Rate of climb: 2,120 ft/min (10.8 m/s)
- Time to altitude:
  - 15,000 ft (4,600 m) in 9 minutes 48 seconds
  - 20,000 ft (6,100 m) in 17 minutes
- Wing loading: 23.7 lb/sq ft (116 kg/m^{2})
- Take-off run: 645 ft (197 m)
- Take-off distance to 50 ft (15 m): 1,155 ft (352 m)
- Landing run: 1,110 ft (340 m)
- Landing distance from 50 ft (15 m): 1,776 ft (541 m)

== See also ==
Related development

- Miles Kestrel
- Miles M.20
- Miles Martinet

Aircraft of comparable role, configuration, and era

- North American Harvard
- Nardi FN.305
- Ikarus MM-2
- Arado Ar 96
- VL Pyry

Related lists

- List of aircraft of the Royal Air Force
