= Combined Raw Materials Board =

World War II U.S.-British government agency

The Combined Raw Materials Board was a temporary World War II government agency that allocated the combined economic resources of the United States and Britain. It was set up by President Franklin D. Roosevelt and Prime Minister Winston Churchill on January 26, 1942. Later Canada participated as an associated member in many of the Board's decisions.

Rosen finds that the Board concentrated on difficult but non-controversial commodity problems. As the war ended its commodity committees were enlarged to include representatives of other nations. The Board closed down at the end of December 1945.

== Mission ==
Roosevelt and Churchill set the Board's mission as:

a. Be composed of a representative of the British Government and a representative of the U.S. Government. The British member will represent and act under the instruction of the Minister of Supply.
b. Plan the best and speediest development, expansion and use of the raw material resources under the jurisdiction or control of the two Governments, and make the recommendations necessary to execute such plans. Such recommendations shall be carried out by all parts of the respective Governments.
c. In collaboration with others of the United Nations work toward the best utilisation of their raw material resources, and, in collaboration with the interested nation or nations, formulate plans and recommendations for the development, expansion, purchase, or other effective use of their raw materials.

The leaders were William L. Batt from the U.S. and Sir Clive Baillieu (both in Washington) and Lord Beaverbrook in London.

== Activities ==
The Board was a coordinating body. In February 1943 it set up a Combined Copper Board and in March 1943 it set up a new Combined Rubber Committee.

== See also ==
- Combined Food Board
- Combined Production and Resources Board
- Military production during World War II
