= De Havilland Don =

DH.93 Don
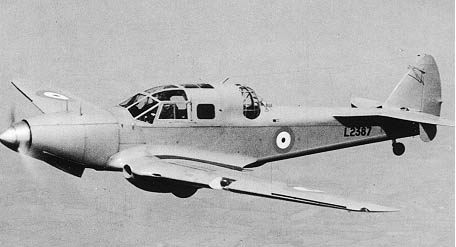
- Prototype DH.93 in flight c. 1937

General information
- Type: Communications/Liaison
- National origin: United Kingdom
- Manufacturer: de Havilland
- Primary user: Royal Air Force
- Number built: 30 (plus 20 unassembled airframes)

History
- Introduction date: 1938
- First flight: 18 June 1937
- Retired: 1940

The de Havilland DH.93 Don was a 1930s British multi-role three-seat training aircraft built by de Havilland Aircraft.

== Design and development ==
The Don was designed to meet Air Ministry Specification T.6/36 for a multi-role trainer and was a single-engined monoplane of wooden stressed-skin construction. The DH.93 Don was intended to be a trainer for pilots and radio operators, and as a gunnery trainer, the gunnery requirement involved the mounting of a dorsal gun turret. Student pilot and instructor sat side by side up front, while accommodation for a trainee WT (radio) operator and the turret gunner was behind in the cabin.

== Operational history ==
The prototype with test marks E-3 (later military serial number L2387) first flew on 18 June 1937 and was transferred to RAF Martlesham Heath for official evaluation. In the course of the trials, more equipment was added which increased the weight, and as a result, in an attempt to reduce weight, the dorsal turret was removed. The aircraft was also modified with small auxiliary fins fitted beneath the tailplane.

Despite the changes incorporated from the fifth aircraft, the type was deemed not suitable for training and the original order for 250 aircraft was reduced to only 50 aircraft, 20 of which were delivered as engineless airframes for ground training. The remaining aircraft served as communications and liaison aircraft, serving with No. 24 Sqn and numerous RAF Station Flights throughout the UK until early 1939, but all were grounded for use as instructional airframes in March 1939.

== Operators ==
United Kingdom

- Royal Air Force
  - No. 24 Squadron RAF
  - station flights

== Specifications (Communications role) ==
Data from de Havilland Aircraft since 1909

General characteristics

- Crew: 1
- Capacity: 2 passengers
- Length: 37 ft 4 in (11.38 m)
- Wingspan: 47 ft 6 in (14.48 m)
- Height: 9 ft 5 in (2.87 m)
- Wing area: 304 sq ft (28.2 m^{2})
- Airfoil: RAF 34 modified
- Empty weight: 5,050 lb (2,291 kg)
- Gross weight: 6,530 lb (2,962 kg)
- Powerplant: 1 × de Havilland Gipsy King V-12 inverted air-cooled piston engine, 525 hp (391 kW)
- Propellers: 2-bladed variable-pitch propeller

Performance

- Maximum speed: 189 mph (304 km/h, 164 kn)
- Range: 890 mi (1,430 km, 770 nmi)
- Service ceiling: 23,300 ft (7,100 m)
- Rate of climb: 820 ft/min (4.2 m/s)

== See also ==
Related lists

- List of aircraft of the Royal Air Force

== Bibliography ==
- The Illustrated Encyclopedia of Aircraft (Part Work 1982–1985). London: Orbis Publishing, 1986. No ISBN.
- Ford, Daniel. "Outmoded Teacher: de Havilland's Don Crew Trainer". Air Enthusiast 105, May/June 2003, pp. 74–75. ISSN 0143-5450.
- Jackson, A.J. de Havilland Aircraft Since 1915. London, Putnam, 1962. No ISBN.
- Jackson, A.J. de Havilland Aircraft since 1909. London:Putnam, Third edition, 1987. ISBN 0-85177-802-X.
