= Combined Food Board =

World War II U.S.-British government agency

The Combined Food Board was a temporary World War II government agency that allocated the combined economic resources of the United States and the United Kingdom. It was set up by President Franklin D. Roosevelt and Prime Minister Winston Churchill on June 9, 1942. Canada, after insisting on its economic importance, was given a place on the board in November, 1942. At first the board was a pawn in a battle between the U.S. Department of Agriculture and the U.S. War Food Administration. After that was resolved, the board ran smoothly, and effectiveness increased. Its major achievement was the multi-nation commodity committees that it set up in 1945, which became the International Emergency Food Council. It tried to organize responses to a massive shortage of food in war-torn areas. It closed in 1946.

== Mission ==
The mission of the Combined Food Board set out by Roosevelt and Churchill was twofold:

This board will be composed of the U.S. Secretary of Agriculture (Mr. Claude Wickard) and the head of the British Food Mission (Mr. R. H. Brand), who will represent and act under the instructions of the Minister of Food. The purpose of the Board shall be to co-ordinate and obtain a planned and expeditious utilisation of the food resources of the United Nations. The duties of the board shall be to consider, investigate, inquire into, and formulate plans with regard to any question in respect of which the U.S. and British Governments have a common concern, relating to supply, production, transportation, disposal, allocation or distribution in or to any part of the world, of foods, agricultural materials from which foods are derived, and equipment and non food materials used in the production of such foods; and agricultural materials, and to make recommendations to the U.S. and British Governments in respect of any such questions. To work in collaboration with others of the United Nations towards the best utilisation of their food resources and, in collaboration with any interested nation or nations, to formulate plans and recommendations for development, expansion, purchase, or other effective use of their food resources. The Board shall be entitled to receive from any agency of the U.S. Government and any department of the British Government information relating to any matter with regard to which the board is competent to make recommendations to those Governments, and in principle the entire food resources of Great Britain and the United States will be deemed to be in a common pool about which fullest information will be interchanged.

== Operations ==
William Mabane, the Parliamentary Secretary to the Minister of Food, explained to Parliament in May 1943 that, "Food strategy was no mere domestic matter, and a scramble between the United Nations for supplies would be disastrous. Combined Food Board machinery had therefore been set up to prevent competitive buying of foodstuffs in short supply and remove any grievance that one country was going short while there was a surplus elsewhere."

The biggest problem was in limited shipping space in convoys bringing foods from the Western Hemisphere, especially with the heavy demands on shipping imposed by the landings in North Africa in November, 1942. There was barely enough space for bringing in even grain for current needs. Lord Woolton, the Minister of Food, urgently called on Britons to eat more potatoes and less bread. He introduced the National Loaf that used much less shipping space, but which consumers could barely stomach.

== See also ==
- Combined Production and Resources Board
- Minister of Food (United Kingdom)
- Rationing in the United Kingdom
- United States home front during World War II § Rationing
