= World War II aircraft production =

This table lists aircraft production during World War II for the major allied and axis powers:

| Country | 1939 | 1940 | 1941 | 1942 | 1943 | 1944 | 1945 | Total | Ref. |
|---|---|---|---|---|---|---|---|---|---|
| United States | 2,141 | 6,086 | 26,277 | 47,836 | 85,898 | 96,318 | 49,761 | 354,750 | |
| Soviet Union | 10,382 | 10,565 | 15,735 | 25,436 | 34,245 | 40,246 | 20,052 | 157,261 | |
| United Kingdom | 7,940 | 15,049 | 20,094 | 23,672 | 26,263 | 26,461 | 12,070 | 131,549 | |
| Germany | 8,295 | 10,826 | 11,776 | 15,596 | 25,527 | 39,807 | 7,540 | 119,371 | |
| Japan | 4,467 | 4,768 | 5,088 | 8,861 | 16,693 | 28,180 | 8,263 | 76,320 | |
| Italy | 1,692 | 2,142 | 3,503 | 2,818 | 967 | (Note: Italy capitulated in 1943.) | - | 11,122 | |
| France | 3,163 | 2,113 | (Note: France capitulated in 1940.) | - | - | - | - | 5,276 | |
| Total | 38,080 | 51,531 | 76,256 | 124,179 | 190,218 | 231,852 | 97,577 | 809,693 | |

== See also ==
- Air warfare of World War II
- List of military aircraft operational during World War II
- German aircraft production during World War II
- United States aircraft production during World War II
- List of aircraft of the United Kingdom in World War II
