= French combat vehicle production during World War II =

This is a list of French combat vehicle production before and during the Second World War. The numbers given are generally those of vehicles actually delivered including exported vehicles. However, it includes those vehicles not yet delivered in June 1940 in the 1940 totals. For the Renault FT only the French metropolitan organic strength and matériel reserve is given. The list excludes those types having been taken out of service by May 1940.

== Tank production ==
Model	before 1 September 1939	1939	1940	Total
Char 2C	10	—	—	10
Renault FT	1580	—	—	1580
NC27	36	—	—	36
Char D1	160	—	—	160
Char D2	50	—	50	100
R 35	1070	200	400	1670
FCM 36	100	—	—	100
Char B1	163	42	200	405
AMR 33	123	—	—	123
AMR 35	167	—	—	167
ZB	16	—	—	16
ZT2	—	—	10	10
ZT3	10	—	—	10
ZT4	—	—	40	40
AMC 34	12	—	—	12
AMC 35	29	23	5	57
Hotchkiss H35	640	130	430	1200
SOMUA S35	270	50	110	430
Total	4436	445	1245	6126

The following points should be taken into consideration:

- The total export number of modern tanks was 281. The total tank assets in France and its colonies were therefore perhaps less than 5802 during the time of the German offensive.
- Of the R 35 245 vehicles were exported; the production numbers of this type for June 1940 are unknown but amount probably to about 91 tanks. The number given is that of the R 35's known to be produced from photographic evidence of the series numbers. During a hearing in 1947 a total production was claimed of 1685. About 75 R 40's were used to equip two Polish battalions in France. The R 35 numbers include the R 40 variant.
- Of the AMC 35 production of at least fifty-seven, at least ten vehicles were exported to Belgium; both the still often stated total production number of 100 for this type and the number of 25 (or 12) for the Belgian tanks are now known to be incorrect. Two AMC 35 chassis were used to build prototypes; it is unclear whether they are included in the 57 total.
- Of the 123 AMR 33 's two were used as prototypes of the AMR 35. Not included in this number is the prototype of the Engin P (Renault VE).
- The often stated number of 200 AMR 35's includes the Renault YS (thirteen command and artillery observation vehicles), the ZT2 and the ZT3, but excludes the ZT4 and the ZB. The ZT4 production consisted of hulls only. In general for French tanks the standard turrets were produced separately; none were ever fitted on the ZT4. The ZT3 was not a tank but a tank destroyer. The ZB was an export version for China.
- The Char D1 number includes the ten pre-series "NC31" vehicles. All 36 NC27's had been exported: one to Sweden, one to Greece, ten to Japan and perhaps 24 to Poland. One Char D1 had been rebuilt into an artillery radio communication tank.
- One Char D2 was being used for the development of a flamethrower.
- The Char B1 numbers include 34 Char B1 proper, two Char B1 ter and 369 Char B1 bis.
- The Hotchkiss H35 numbers include the informally named "H 38" or "H 39" variants (at the time both informal names indicated the same derived type). The total production number of 1200 given, is the minimal proven by photographic evidence regarding the series numbers. The first vehicles with the original engine and gun numbered 400; about half of the remainder was built or refitted with the L/35 SA 38 gun. Five H 35's were exported.
- Of the Char 2C two vehicles had been cannibalised. The 1580 FT 17's were all of the machine gun type. During the Fall of France they equipped units with an organic strength of 1105. There were about 1000 additional FT 17 chassis in use or being rebuilt as utility vehicles and about 261 FT 17's serving in the colonies. Both types were obsolete tanks of WW-I vintage, so the total number of modern French tanks was over 4400 in June 1940.

The numbers given for 1 September 1939 and the 1939 totals are those of the deliveries; actual production numbers were in general somewhat higher as the army would only accept those vehicles that could be used immediately to equip units and training lagged behind production. So the number for 1939 is lower than the actual production; e.g. the ZT2's were produced towards the end of 1939. This growing backlog led to a sudden release of tanks in May which is sometimes mistaken for a jump in production. However actual production in 1940 again lagged behind production goals: 477 for the last four months of 1939 and 1226 for the first five months of 1940 only. It was planned to build 3087 tanks in the last seven months: 840 R 40's, 373 Char B1's, 1750 H 35's and 124 S 35/40's; these numbers included a monthly production of 75 H 35's in Britain.

== Armoured car and half-track production ==
Armoured car and half-track AFV deliveries were:

Model	before 1 September 1939	1939	1940	total
AMD White TBC	86	—	—	86
AMD Laffly 50	98	—	—	98
AMD Laffly 80	28	—	—	28
AMD Laffly S15 TOE	45	—	—	45
AMD Berliet VUDB	32	—	—	32
AMD Panhard 165/175	30	—	—	30
AMD Panhard 178	219	69	243	533
AMC Schneider P 16	96	—	—	96
Total	634	69	243	946

It was intended to continue the production of the AMD 35 Panhard 178 at a rate of sixty per month. The Panhard 178 numbers include some hulls not fitted with a turret, but exclude the continued production in 1940 for Germany which probably amounted to 176 vehicles.

After the armistice in the unoccupied Free Zone of France, a clandestine rebuild took place of 225 GMC Trucks into armoured cars. When all of France was occupied in 1942, the secret hiding places (caves in fact) were betrayed to the Germans.

== See also ==
- Other countries' production figures
  - Germany
  - Soviet Union
  - United Kingdom
  - United States
