= Soviet combat vehicle production during World War II =

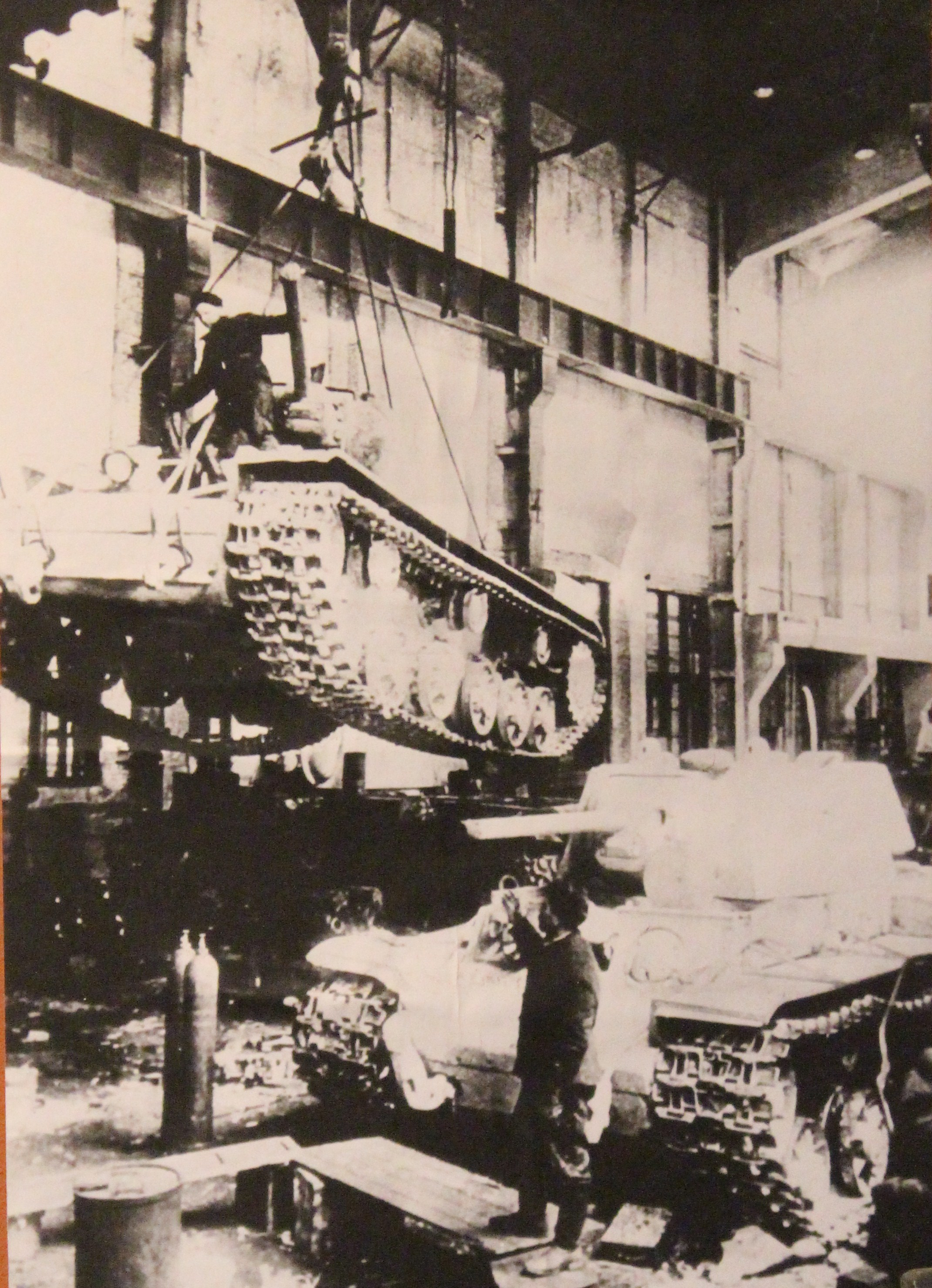
Production of KV-1 heavy tanks

Soviet armoured fighting vehicle production during World War II from the start of the German invasion of the Soviet Union on 22 June 1941 was large. Although the Soviet Union had a large force of combat vehicles before the German invasion, heavy losses led to a high demand for new vehicles. Production was complicated by the loss of production facilities in the western part of the Soviet Union, and entire factories were moved east of the Ural Mountains to put them out of reach of the Germans. In general, Soviet tanks had less interior space than the tanks of other nations (which made them smaller targets) – this was possible because the Red Army only employed soldiers of small stature in their tank forces.

Combat experience in the Spanish Civil War (1936–1939), the Battles of Khalkhin Gol (1939) and the Winter War (1939–1940) showed the Soviet military that light tanks (such as the T-26) were too lightly armoured and that multi-turreted tanks (such as the T-35) were inferior to single turret tanks which guided the switch to the later vital T-34 medium and KV-1 heavy tanks.

Figures are up until the first half of 1945 and only include new production. The Soviet Union had 25,664 or 25,481 armoured fighting vehicles on 1 June 1941 before it entered the war.

Not shown here are armoured cars, aerosans, artillery tractors and armoured trains.

== Light armoured fighting vehicles ==
Armoured vehicles under about 15 tonnes (15 long tons; 17 short tons) could be produced and rebuilt in many light industrial installations, such as automotive, streetcar, and light tractor factories. Most were driven by standard automotive engines.

For these reasons light tank production continued well into the war, even though the medium T-34 was much more cost-effective. Foreign light tanks continued to be delivered under Lend-Lease, but domestic production would be replaced by cheaper armoured cars and the plentiful SU-76M self-propelled gun, which was simpler but packed a bigger high-explosive punch.

| | Type | 1940 | 1941 | 1942 | 1943 | 1944 | 1945 | Total |
|---|---|---|---|---|---|---|---|---|
| Tanks | T-26 | 1,601 1,613 | 116 47 | | | | | 1,717 or 1,660 |
| Tanks | BT-7 | 779 780 | | | | | | 779 or 780 |
| Tanks | T-40 | 41 | 668 675 | 180 | | | | 709 or 896 |
| Tanks | T-50 | | 48 60 | 15 | | | | 63 or 75 |
| Tanks | T-60 | | 1,388 1,366 | 4,477 4,352 | 55 | | | 5,920 or 5,773 |
| Tanks | T-70 | | | 4,883 | 3,348 | | | 8,231 |
| SP guns | ZiS-30 | | 101 | | | | | 101 |
| SP guns | SU-76 | | | 25 | 1,908 | 7,155 | 2,966 | 12,054 |
| | Total | 2,422 or 2,433 | 2,321 or 2,249 | 9,580 or 9,455 | 5,311 | 7,155 | 2,966 | 29,856 or 29,569 |

The SU-76 was a 76 mm gun mounted on a lengthened version of the T-70 chassis.

== Medium armoured fighting vehicles ==
Building and overhauling heavier armoured vehicles required specialized heavy machinery. Their main components were produced and assembled in facilities which also built heavy tractors, artillery, locomotives, and ship components.

The T-34 tank's basic design was optimal, and continual development of industrial processes allowed it to be produced in greater numbers than any other armoured vehicle during the war.

Medium self-propelled guns were reasonably successful in the pure anti-tank role, but larger-calibre guns would become more common on heavier chassis, which could better handle their heavy recoil and carry adequate provision of their large ammunition.

| | Type | 1939 | 1940 | 1941 | 1942 | 1943 | 1944 | 1945 | Total |
|---|---|---|---|---|---|---|---|---|---|
| Tanks | T-28 | 131 | 13 | | | | | | 144 |
| Tanks | T-34 | | 115 | 3016 | 12,661 | 15,710 | 3,986 | | 35,488 |
| Tanks | T-34-85 | | | | | | 10,662 | 12,551 | 23,213 |
| Tanks | T-44 | | | | | | 25 | 325 | 350 |
| SP guns | SU-85 | | | | | 756 | 1894 | | 2,650 |
| SP guns | SU-100 | | | | | | 500 | 1,270 | 1,770 |
| SP guns | SU-122 | | | | 25 | 615 | | | 640 |
| | Total | 131 | 128 | 3,016 | 12,686 | 17,081 | 17,067 | 14,146 | 64,255 |

The T-28 was an older tank reaching the end of its production in 1940, and there were several hundred fielded already.

The T-34 was originally armed with a 76-mm gun; this was upgraded to a higher-velocity 76-mm, then finally to an 85-mm gun in a bigger turret. The production given for the T-34/85 in 1945 is the full production of that year.

The SU-85, SU-122 and SU-100 were all casemate-enclosed self-propelled guns mounted on the chassis of the T-34. The SU-85 and the later SU-100 mounted high-velocity guns and were designed for anti-tank work. The SU-122 mounted the lower-velocity 122-mm M-30 howitzer, and was mainly used as battlefield assault artillery against infantry.

== Heavy armoured fighting vehicles ==
Soviet heavy tank production was constantly in danger of cancellation during the war, and only continued thanks to constant improvement and liberal doses of political interference. These vehicles required significantly more resources to produce than the T-34 medium tank, and were always outmatched by it in some significant way. The most successful were the later IS-2 tank and heavy self-propelled guns, whose large-calibre firepower was generally useful against both soft and hard targets. Soviet high command had examined and rejected the 100mm D-10s Gun for the IS2, despite its very high penetration, as it was not able to provide the high explosive support needed against soft targets.

| | Type | 1940 | 1941 | 1942 | 1943 | 1944 | 1945 | Total |
|---|---|---|---|---|---|---|---|---|
| Tanks | KV-1 | 141 | 1,121 | 1,753 | | | | 3,015 |
| Tanks | KV-1S | | | 780 | 452 | | | 1,232 |
| Tanks | KV-8 | | | 102 | 35 | | | 137 |
| Tanks | KV-85 | | | | 130 | | | 130 |
| Tanks | IS-2 | | | | 102 | 2,252 | 1,500 | 3,854 |
| Tanks | IS-3 | | | | | | 350 | 350 |
| SP guns | KV-2 | 102 | 232 | | | | | 334 |
| SP guns | SU-152 | | | | 668 | 2 | | 670 |
| SP guns | ISU-122/152 | | | | 35 | 2,510 | 1,250 | 3,795 |
| | Total | 243 | 1,353 | 2,635 | 1,422 | 4,764 | 3,100 | 13,517 |

=== Heavy tanks ===
The KV-1 (named after Kliment Voroshilov) was armed with a 76 mm gun; as with the T-34, the length of the gun was increased during production. The KV-1S was a version of the KV-1 with lighter armour (making it faster) and a new turret (still with a 76 mm gun). KV-85 was a KV-1S fitted with an 85 mm gun in the same turret as the IS-1.

After Voroshilov lost political favour, the new KV-13 model with the KV-85's turret and gun was renamed IS-1 after Joseph (Iosif) Stalin. It was soon upgraded to a new turret with high-velocity 122 mm gun, and renamed IS-2, finally giving a slow, expensive heavy tank one clear superiority over the medium T-34.

The IS-3 was an IS-2 with new, advanced hull and turret armour. It saw no combat in World War II.

The KV-8 was a flamethrower tank.

=== Heavy self-propelled guns ===
The KV-2 used the same hull as the KV-1 but was armed with a 152 mm howitzer in a huge turret - which could not even rotate on uneven terrain - and was intended for use against fortified targets and infantry. The SU-152 was a 152 mm howitzer, casemate-housed on a KV-1S hull. Like the KV-2 it was intended for use as an assault weapon against infantry, but used the cheaper and less exposed Samokhodnaya Ustanovka-designated style of casemate mount.

The ISU-122 and ISU-152 were self-propelled guns on casemate-fitted IS hulls. They were both used as heavy assault guns; and both were useful as Anti Tank weapons. The 122s D25 Gun could penetrate almost any German tank, and the 152s ML20 had long been used against enemy armour; although it had a low velocity, the massive shell could inflict considerable damage through concussive effects.

== Armoured cars ==
- BA-64 – 9100 produced
- PB-4
- BA-6 – 221 built
- BA-10
- BA-11 – 17 built

== See also ==
- Soviet industry in World War II
- List of Soviet tank factories
- French armoured fighting vehicle production during World War II
- German armored fighting vehicle production during World War II
- British armoured fighting vehicle production during World War II
- American armored fighting vehicle production during World War II
