= German armored fighting vehicle production during World War II =

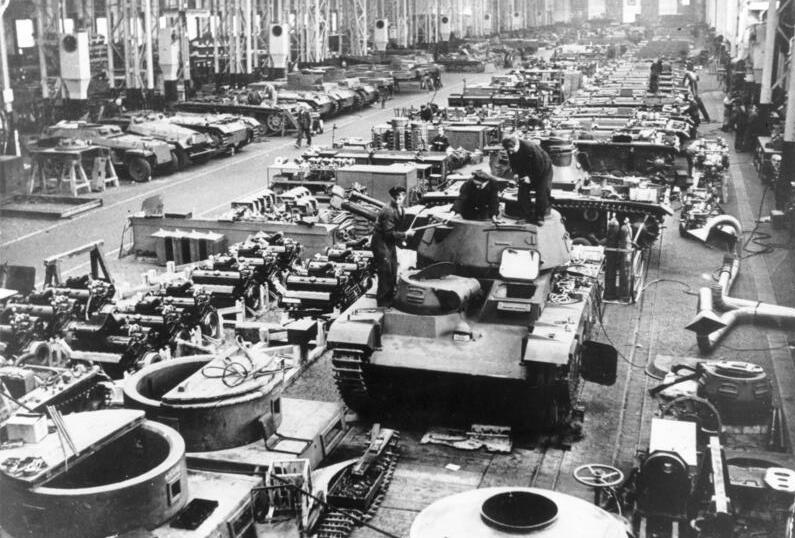
Early war production.

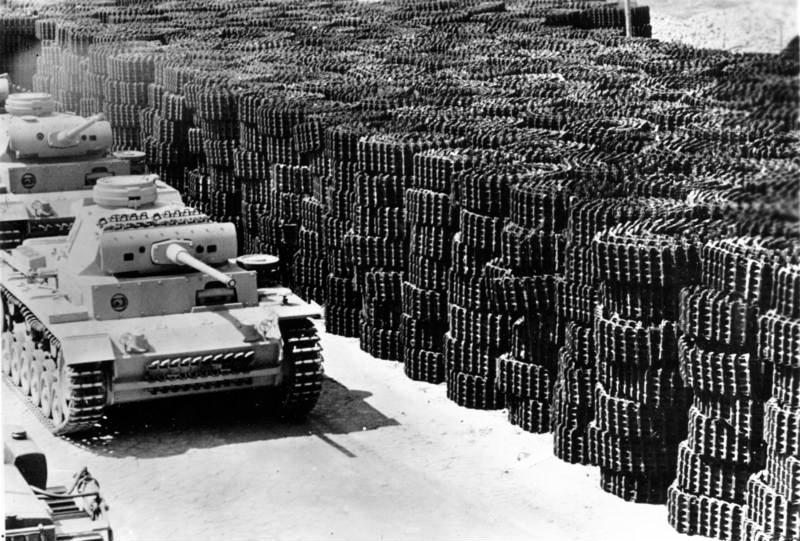
Panzer IIIs move off the factory grounds, 1942.

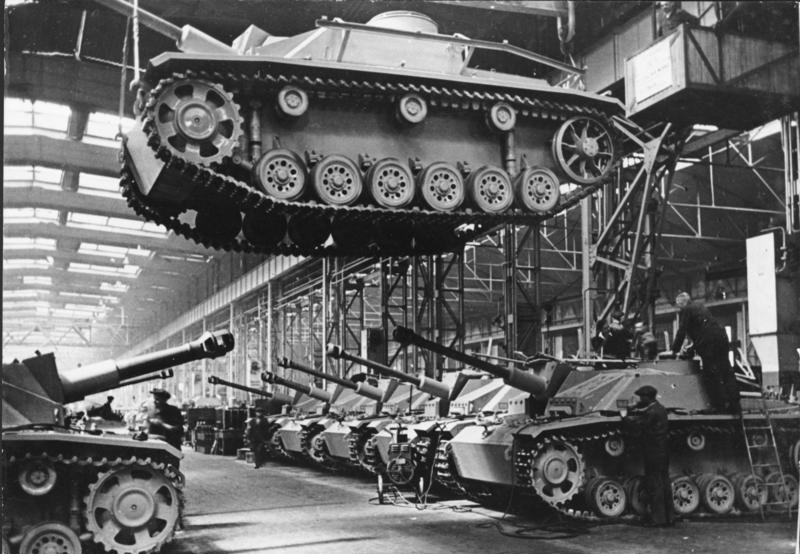
Alkett production plant.

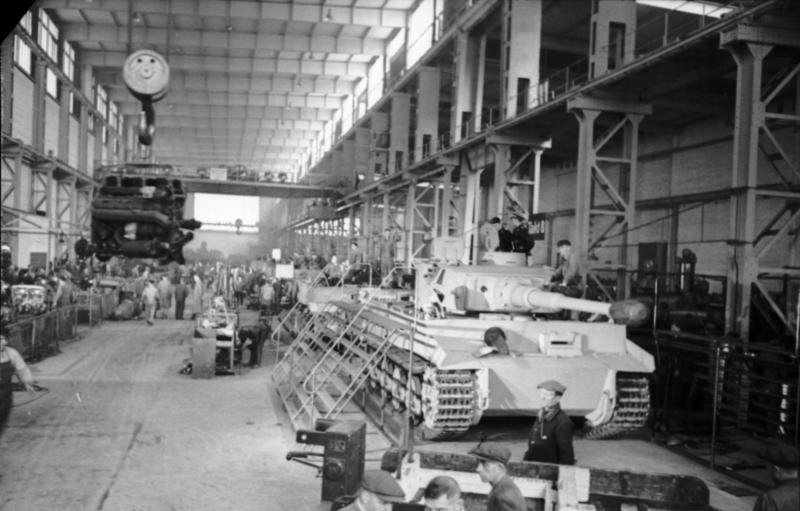
Tiger I production, 1944

This article lists production figures for German armored fighting vehicles during the World War II era. Vehicles include tanks, self-propelled artillery, assault guns and tank destroyers.

Where figures for production in 1939 are given, they refer to September 1939 onwards; that is, they only count wartime production.

== Total production ==
Production of armoured fighting vehicles
	Pre-war	1939	1940	1941	1942	1943	1944	1945	Wartime	Total
Panzer I	1,893	-	-	-	-	-	-	-	-	1,893
Panzer II	1,223	15	99	265	848	803	151	-	2,181	3,404
Panzer 38(t)	78	153	367	678	652	1,008	2,356	1,335	6,549	6,627
Panzer III	98	157	1,054	2,213	2,958	3,379	4,752	1,136	15,649	15,747
Panzer IV	210	45	368	467	994	3,822	6,625	1,090	13,311	13,522
Panzer V Panther	-	-	-	-	-	1,849	4,003	705	6,557	6,557
Panzer VI E Tiger I	-	-	-	-	78	649	641	-	1,368	1,368
Panzer VI B Tiger II	-	-	-	-	-	1	428	140	569	569
Elefant	-	-	-	-	-	90	-	-	90	90
Total	3,502	370	1,888	3,623	5,530	11,601	18,956	4,406	46,274	49,777

During World War II, Germany also produced:

- 3,024 reconnaissance vehicles
- 2,450 other armoured vehicles
- 21,880 armoured personnel carriers
- 36,703 semi-tracked tractors
- 87,329 semi-tracked trucks
- 347,490 military trucks and lorries
- 226,337 military cars
- 97,470 military motorcycles
- 245,389 train waggons

Notes:

- Figures include tank production and chassis production used for other variants (for example, Panzer III figures include StuG III assault gun production, etc.).
- Panzer III figures for 1942 and 1943 excludes 700 Panzer III Ausf N models converted from older variants.
- Germany also produced 44,259 armored half-tracks and 3,607 armored cars during the war.

== Panzer I ==
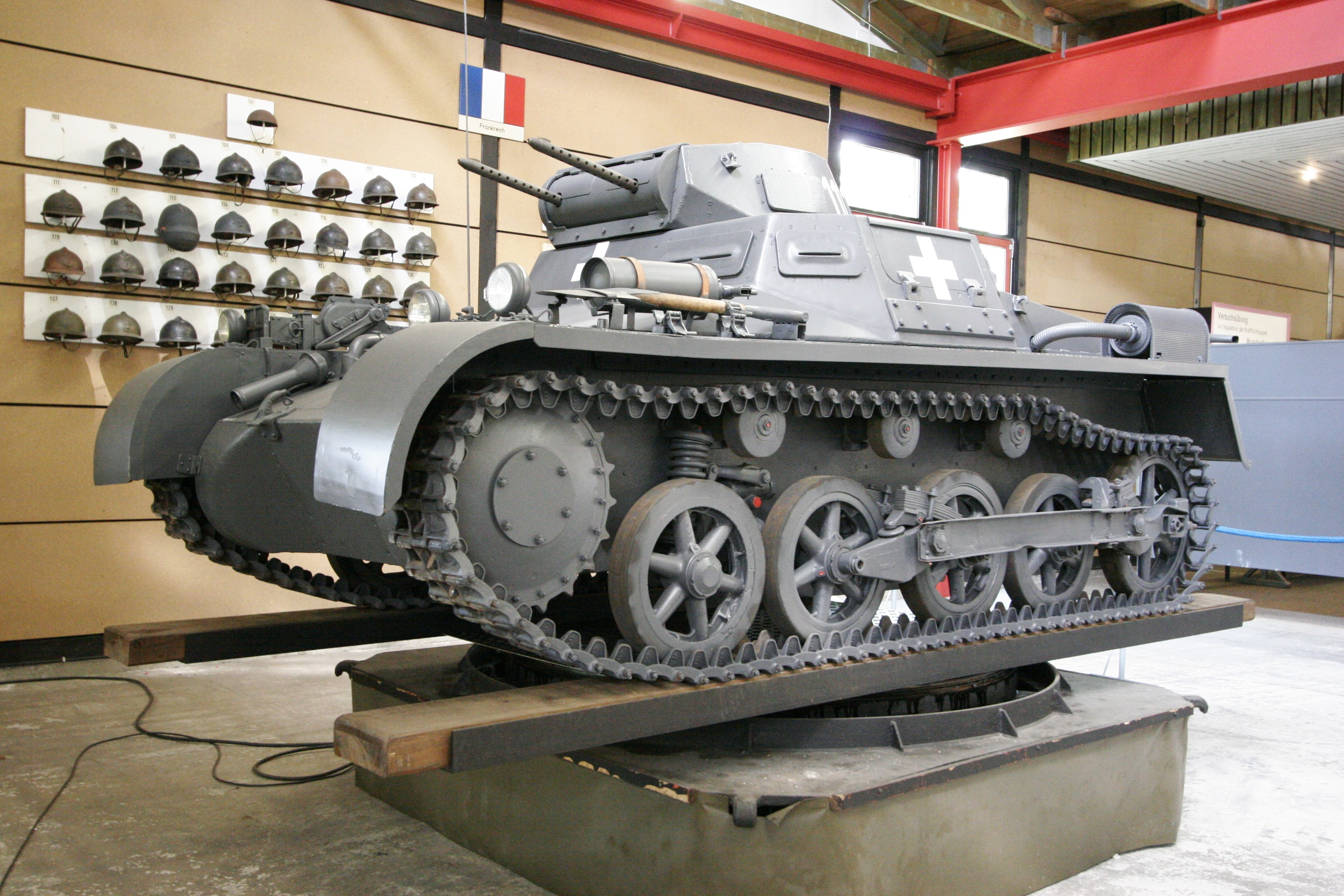
Panzer I Ausf. A

Panzer I Pre-war: 1,893 hulls had been produced. 1,867 were fitted with turrets, and the rest used as command vehicles. These lightly armed and armoured tanks were intended as training vehicles but were used in combat during the early-war period in Germany's Blitzkrieg, making up a large share of Germany's early tank force —around 1,445 units in Poland and other smaller amounts in France and other countries.

== Panzer II ==
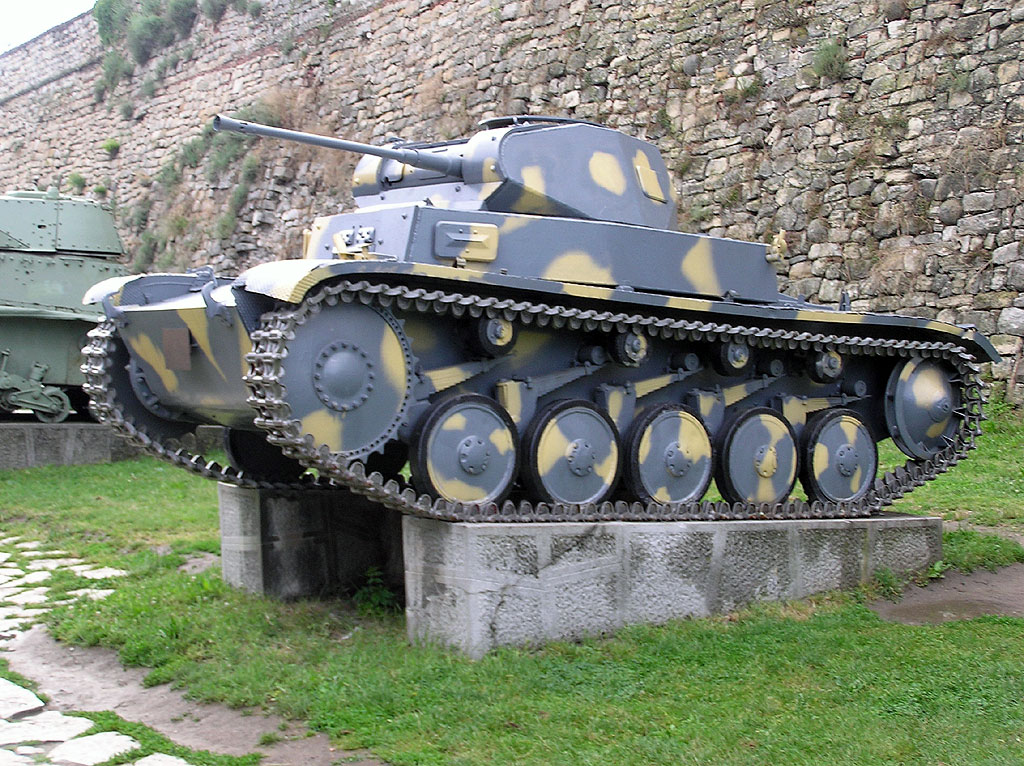
Panzer II

Panzer II Pre-war: 1,223.

	1939	1940	1941	1942	1943	1944	1945	Total
Panzer II	15	9	223	302	77	7	-	633
Panzer IIF "Flamingo"	-	90	42	23	-	-	-	155
Marder II	-	-	-	511	212	-	-	723
Wespe	-	-	-	-	514	144	-	658
Sturmpanzer II	-	-	-	12	-	-	-	12
Total	15	99	265	848	803	151	-	2,181

Variants:

- Panzer II (f) - flamethrower tank (converted from older types)
- Marder II - 75 mm PaK 40 L/46 or captured Soviet 76.2 mm gun on Panzer II chassis (Sd.Kfz. 131/132) (some converted from older types)
- Wespe - 105 mm light field howitzer on Panzer II chassis (Sd.Kfz. 124)
- Sturmpanzer II - 150 mm heavy infantry gun on Panzer II chassis

== Panzer 38(t) ==
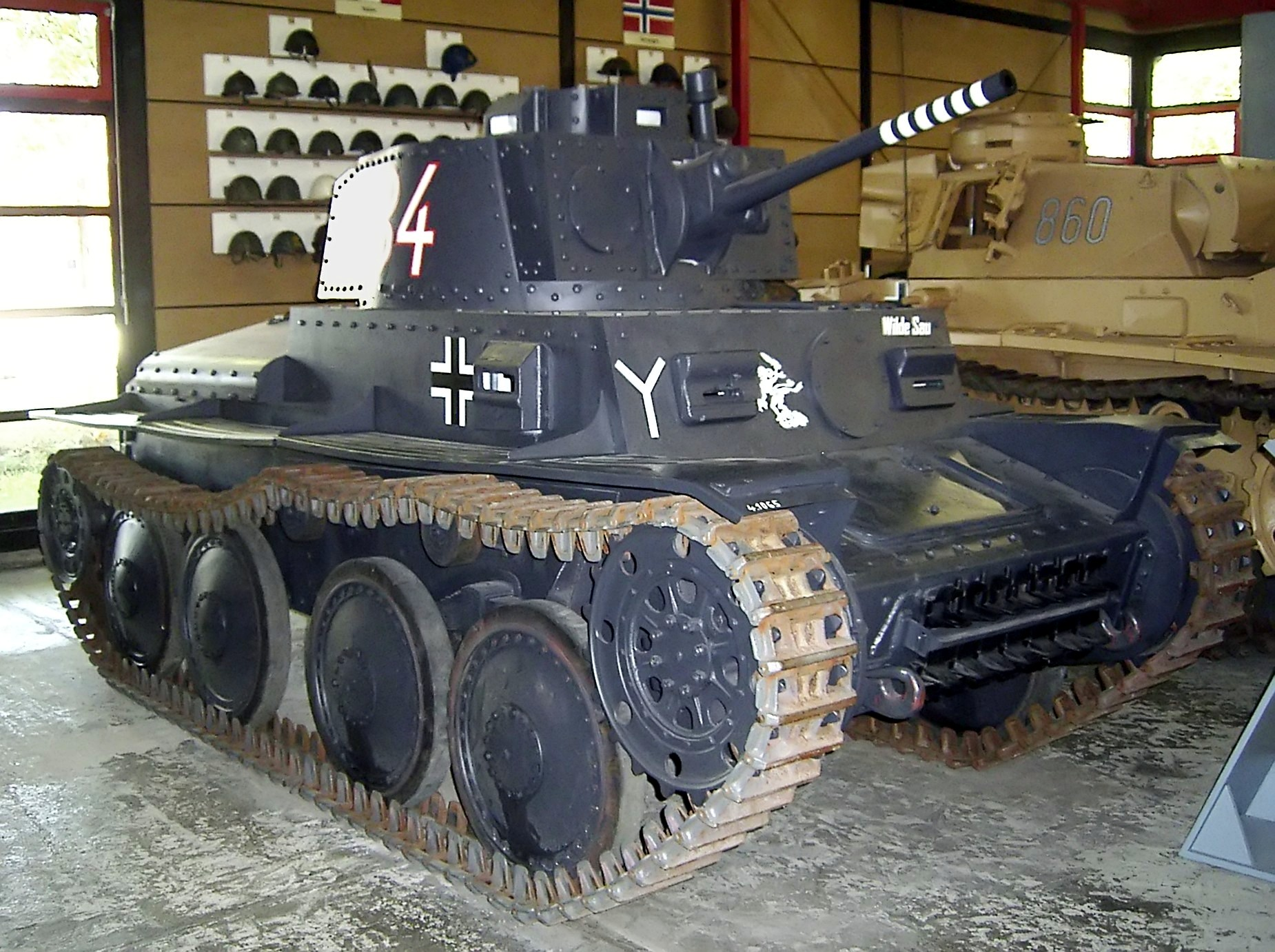
Panzer 38(t)

The Panzer 38(t) was a pre-war Czech tank design, following the Occupation of Czechoslovakia, the Czechoslovak industry became an extension of Germany's. Pre-war: 78.

	1939	1940	1941	1942	1943	1944	1945	Total
Panzer 38(t)	153	367	678	198	-	-	-	1,396
Marder III Sd.Kfz. 138	-	-	-	110	783	323	-	1,216
Marder III Sd.Kfz. 139	-	-	-	344	-	-	-	344
Grille	-	-	-	-	225	346	-	571
Jagdpanzer 38(t) "Hetzer"	-	-	-	-	-	1,687	1,335	3,022
Total	153	367	678	652	1,008	2,356	1,335	6,549

Variants:

- Marder III (7.5 cm PaK 40/3 auf Panzerkampfwagen 38(t), Sd.Kfz. 138)) - mobile anti-tank guns formed by mounting 75 mm PaK 40 L/46 gun on Panzer 38(t) chassis
- Marder III (Panzerjäger 38(t) für 7.62cm PaK36(r), Sd.Kfz.139) - reworked Soviet 76.2 mm guns on Panzer 38(t) chassis
- Grille - 150 mm heavy infantry gun on Panzer 38(t) chassis (figures include munition-carrying versions of the Grille) (Sd.Kfz. 138/1)
- Jagdpanzer 38 (Sd.Kfz. 138/2), "Hetzer" (Note: a name popularised post war)) - 75 mm PaK 39 L/48 gun on a widened Pz 38(t) chassis (Sd.Kfz. 138/2)

== Panzer III ==
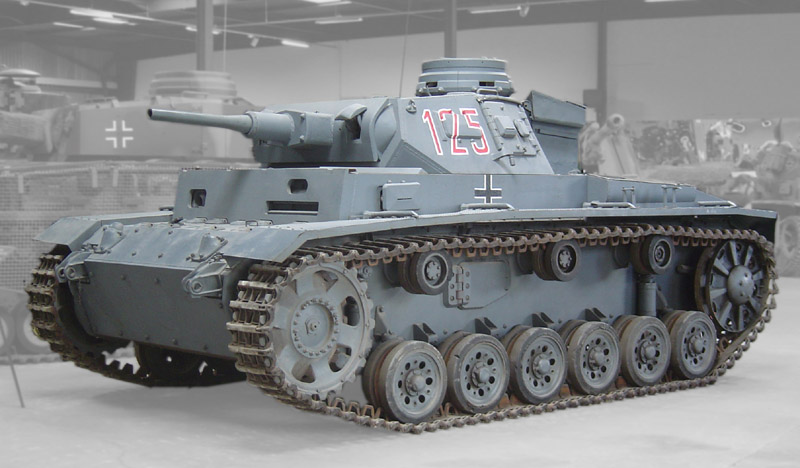
Panzer III

Panzer III Pre-war: 98.

	1939	1940	1941	1942	1943	1944	1945	Total
Panzer III A-F	157	396	-	-	-	-	-	553
Panzer III G-J	-	466	1,673	251	-	-	-	2,390
Panzer III J/1-M	-	-	-	1,907	64	-	-	1,971
Panzer III N	-	-	-	450	250	-	-	700
Panzer III (f)	-	-	-	-	100	-	-	100
Sturmgeschütz III A-E	-	192	540	93	-	-	-	825
Sturmgeschütz III F-G	-	-	-	695	3,011	3,849*	1,038	8,593
StuH 42	-	-	-	12	204	903	98	1,217
Total	157	1,054	2,213	2,958	3,379	4,752	1,136	15,649

* not including 173 converted Panzer III.

Totals do not include any Panzer III N models as these were converted from 3 (J), 447 (L), 213 (M) and 37 other Panzer III variants.

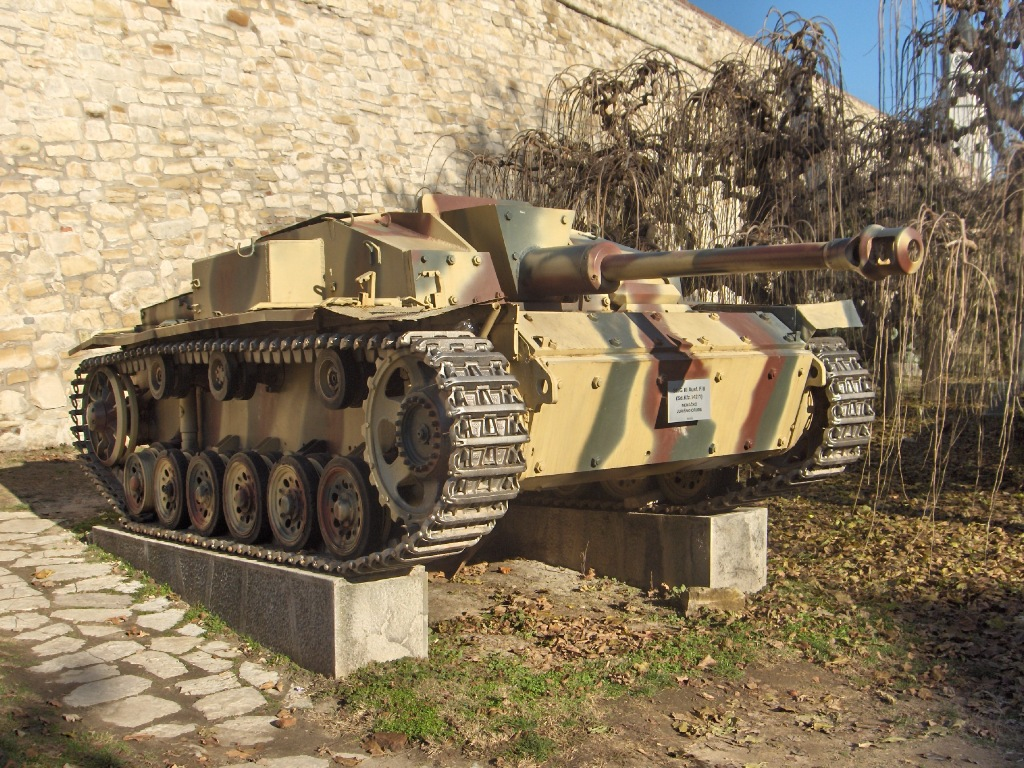
StuG III Ausf. F/8

Variants:

- Panzer III A-F - armed with 37 mm gun
- Panzer III G-J - armed with 50 mm L/42 gun
- Panzer III J/1-M - armed with 50 mm L/60 gun
- Panzer III N - armed with 75 mm L/24 gun (converted older types)
- Panzer III (f) - armed with flamethrower
- Sturmgeschütz III ausf A-E (StuG III, Sd.Kfz. 142) - Sturmgeschütz III. Assault gun armed with 75 mm L/24 on Panzer III chassis
- StuG III ausf F-G - Sturmgeschütz 40. Assault gun armed with 75 mm L/43 or L/48 on Panzer III chassis (Sd.Kfz. 142/1)
- Sturmhaubitze 42 (StuH 42, Sd. Kfz. 142/2). StuG III with 105 mm light field howitzer

== Panzer IV ==
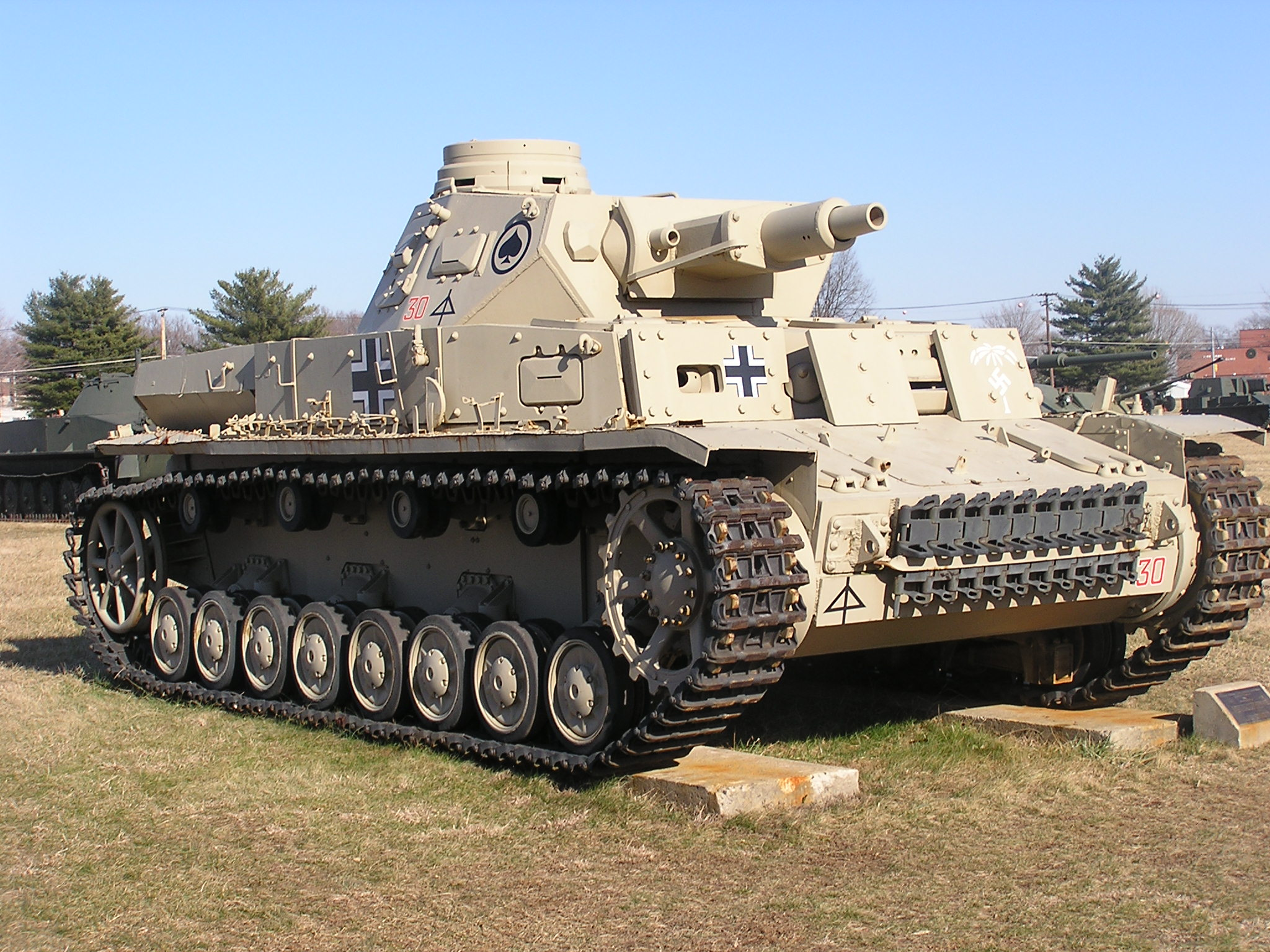
Panzer IV Ausf. D

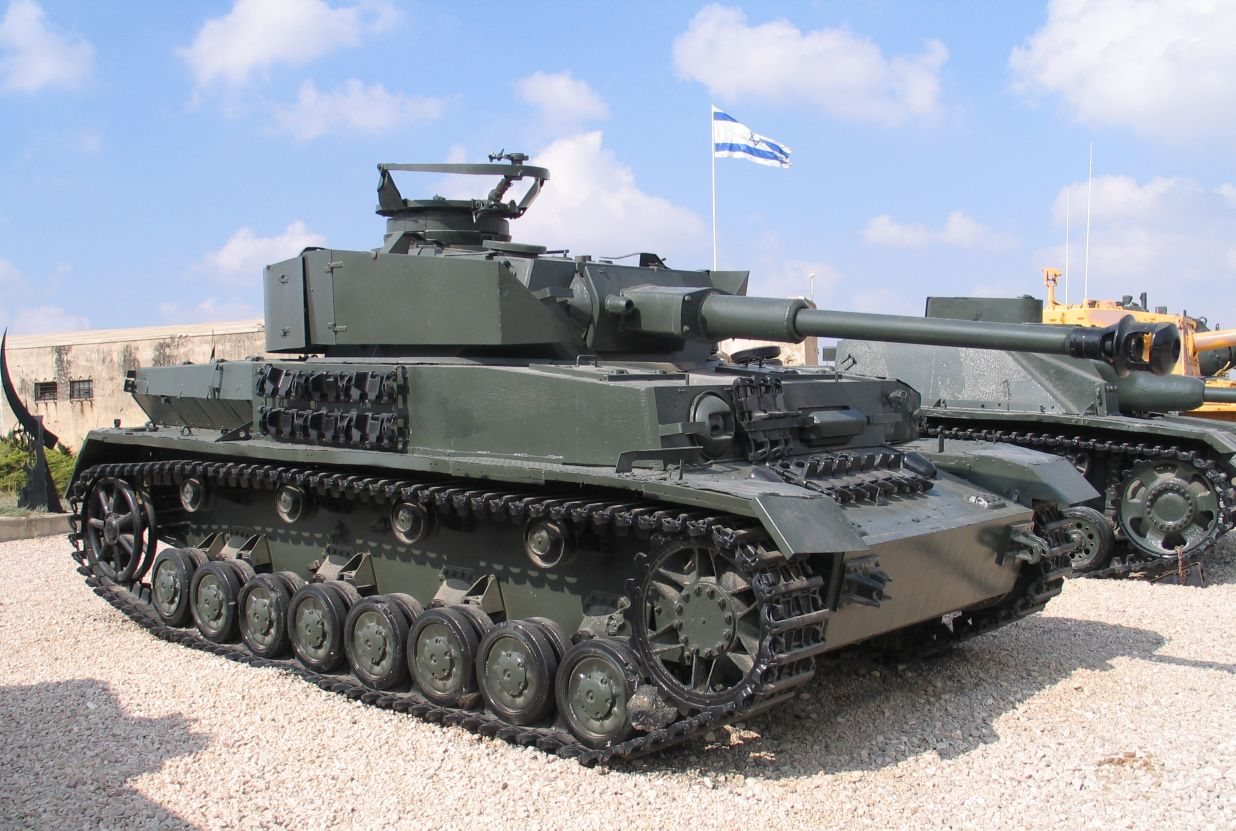
Panzer IV Ausf J

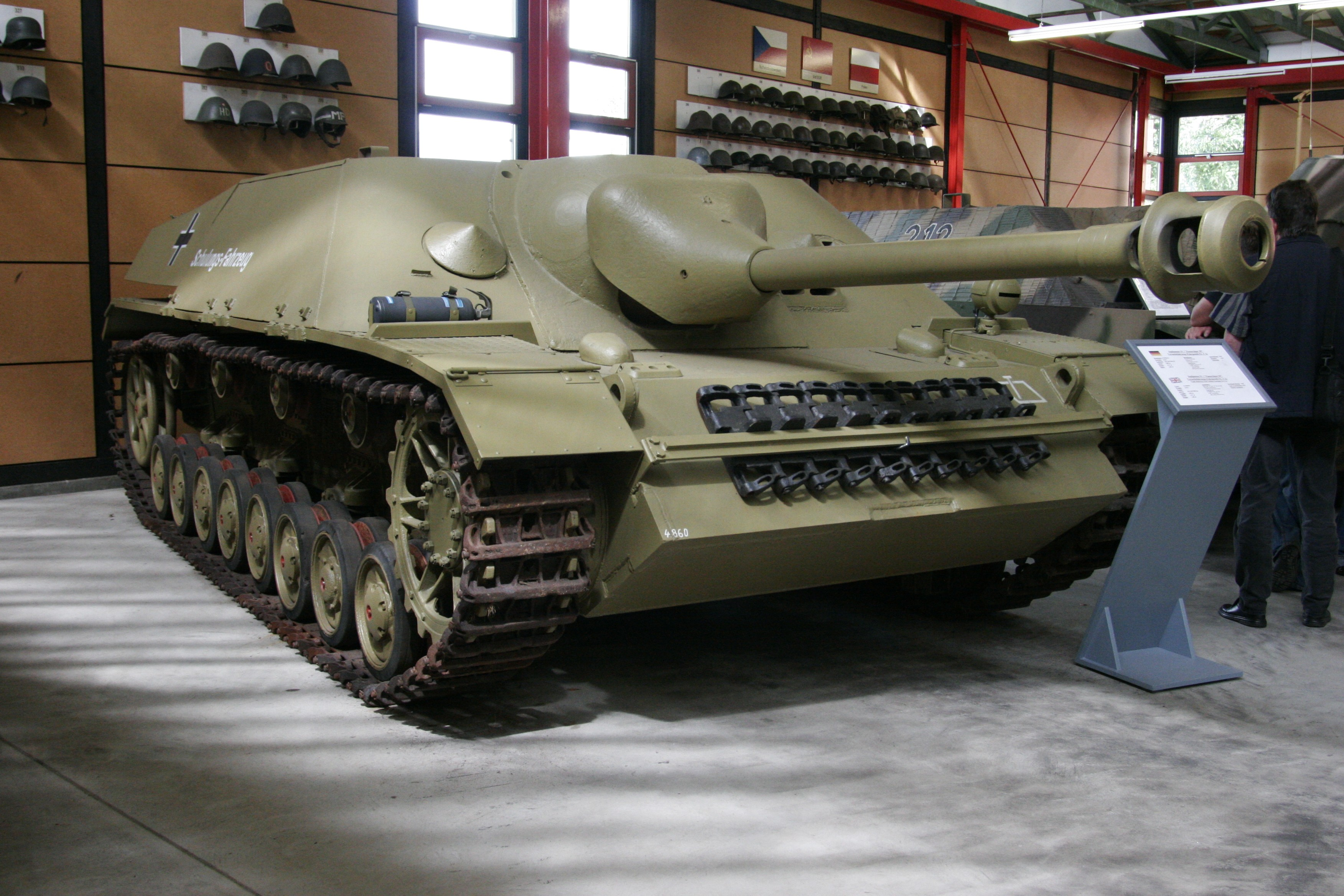
Jagdpanzer IV/48

Panzer IV Pre-war: 211.

	1939	1940	1941	1942	1943	1944	1945	Total
Panzer IV A-F1	45	268	467	124	-	-	-	904
Panzer IV F2-J	-	-	-	870	3,013	3,126	385	7,394
Sturmgeschütz IV	-	-	-	-	30	1,006	105	1,141
Jagdpanzer IV	-	-	-	-	-	769	-	769
Jagdpanzer IV/70	-	-	-	-	-	767	441	1,208
Sturmpanzer IV	-	-	-	-	66	215	17	298
Hornisse	-	-	-	-	345	133	16	494
Hummel	-	-	-	-	368	289	57	714
Möbelwagen	-	-	-	-	-	205	35	240
Wirbelwind	-	-	-	-	-	100	6	106
Ostwind	-	-	-	-	-	15	28	43
Total	45	268	467	994	3,822	6,625	1,090	13,311

Variants:

- Panzer IV A-F1 - Panzer IV with short 75 mm L/24 gun
- Panzer IV F2-J - Panzer IV with long 75 mm L/43 or L/48 gun
- StuG IV (Sd.Kfz. 167) - Assault gun. Modified superstructure of Sturmgeschütz III Ausf. G on Panzer IV chassis; armed with 75 mm L/48 gun
- Jagdpanzer IV (Sd.Kfz. 162) - Tank destroyer with 75 mm L/48 gun on Panzer IV chassis
- Jagdpanzer IV/70 (Sd.Kfz. 162/1) - Tank destroyer with 75 mm L/70 gun on Panzer IV chassis
- Sturmpanzer IV ( (Sd.Kfz. 166, "Brummbär") - with 150 mm field howitzer on Panzer IV chassis
- Hornisse (Sd. Kfz. 164, 88 mm PaK43/1 auf Geschützwagen III/IV, later known as Nashorn)
- Hummel (Sd.Kfz. 165) - 150 mm field howitzer on Geschützwagen III/IV chassis
- Möbelwagen (Flakpanzer IV Sd.Kfz.161/3) - Anti aircraft. Single 37mm FlaK 43 gun on Panzer IV chassis
- Wirbelwind (Flakpanzer IV) - Anti aircraft. quadruple 20mm FlaK 38 guns in armoured turret on Panzer IV chassis,
- Ostwind (Flakpanzer IV) - Anti Aircraft. Single 37mm FlaK 43 in armoured turret on Panzer IV chassis, with

The Panzer IV was originally armed with a low-velocity short-barreled (L/24) 75 mm gun. In 1942 this was upgraded to a 75 mm L/43 gun, and in 1943 to a 75 mm L/48 gun. For the purposes of the above table, both these guns are classed as "long" and displayed on the same row (Ausf. F2-J).

== Panther (Panzer V) ==
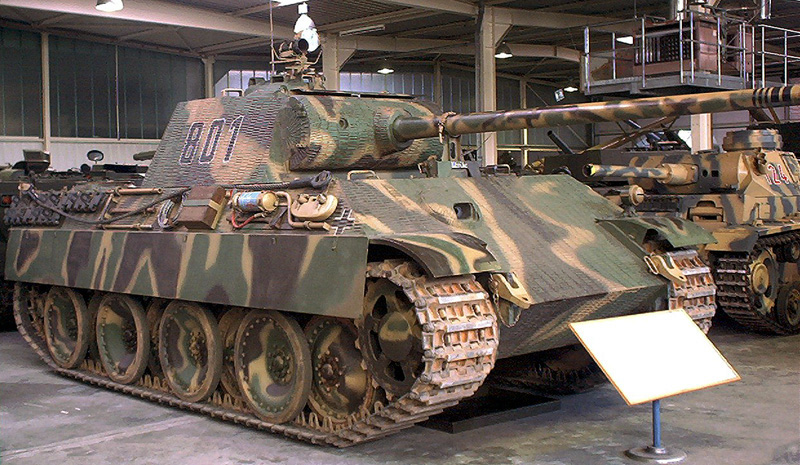
Panther Ausf. G

The Panther (Panzer V Panther, Sd.Kfz. 171) was a medium tank armed with a 75 mm KwK 42 L/70 gun. It was intended to replace the Panzer III and IV. The Jagdpanther (Sd.Kfz. 173) was a Jagdpanzer ("hunting tank") variant with the more powerful 88 mm L/71 PaK43 gun on modified Panther chassis. A successor to the Ferdinand and Nashorn, these were used by heavy anti-tank battalions.

Panther tank production
	1943	1944	1945	Total
Panther	1,848	3,777	507	6,132
Jagdpanther	1	226	198	425
Total	1,849	4,003	705	6,557

Variants:

== Tiger (Panzer VI) ==
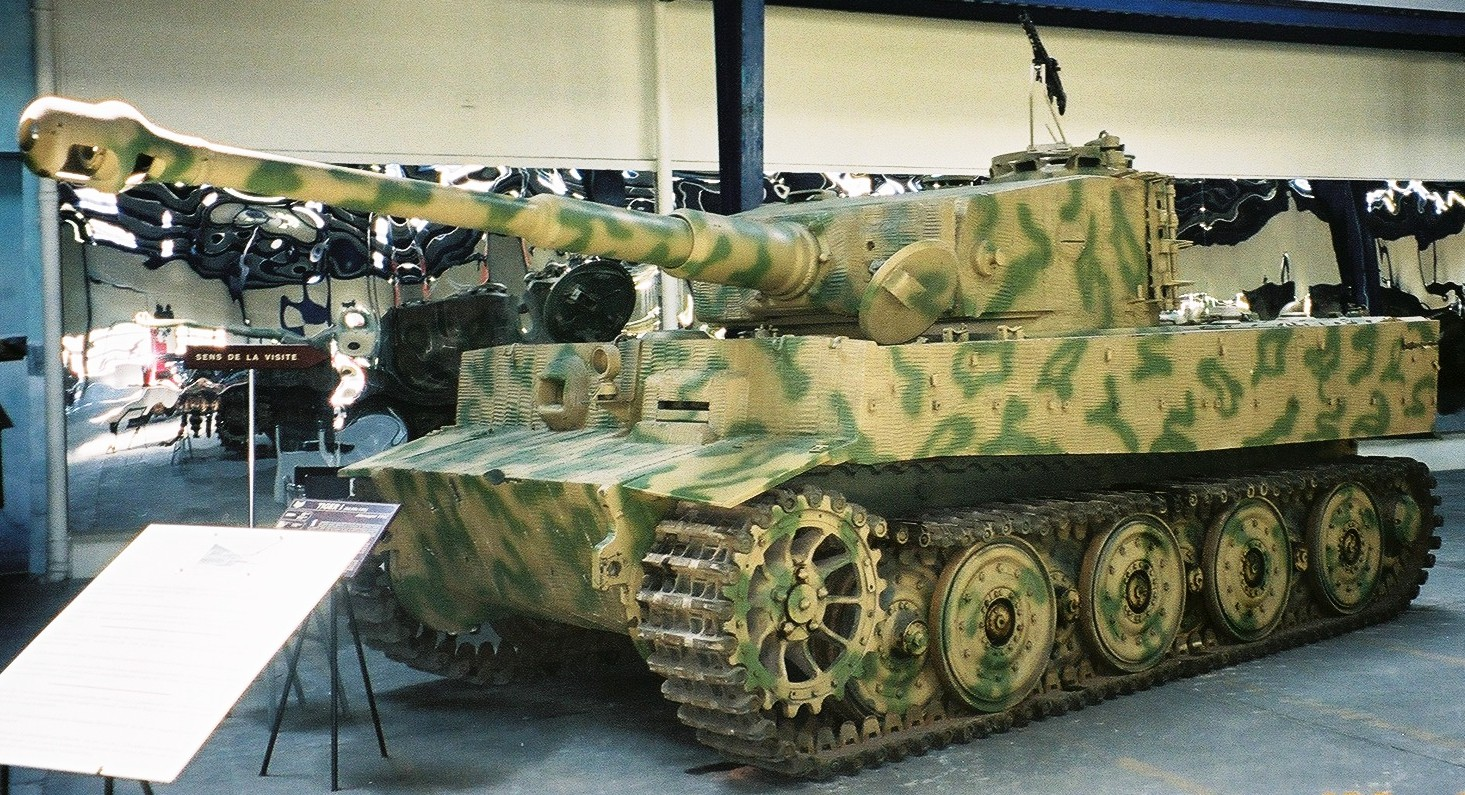
Panzer VI Ausf. H Tiger I

	1942	1943	1944	1945	Total
Tiger I	78	649	623	-	1,350
Sturmtiger	-	-	(18)	-	(18)
Tiger II	-	1	377	112	490
Jagdtiger	-	-	51	28	79
Total	78	650	1,051	140	1,919

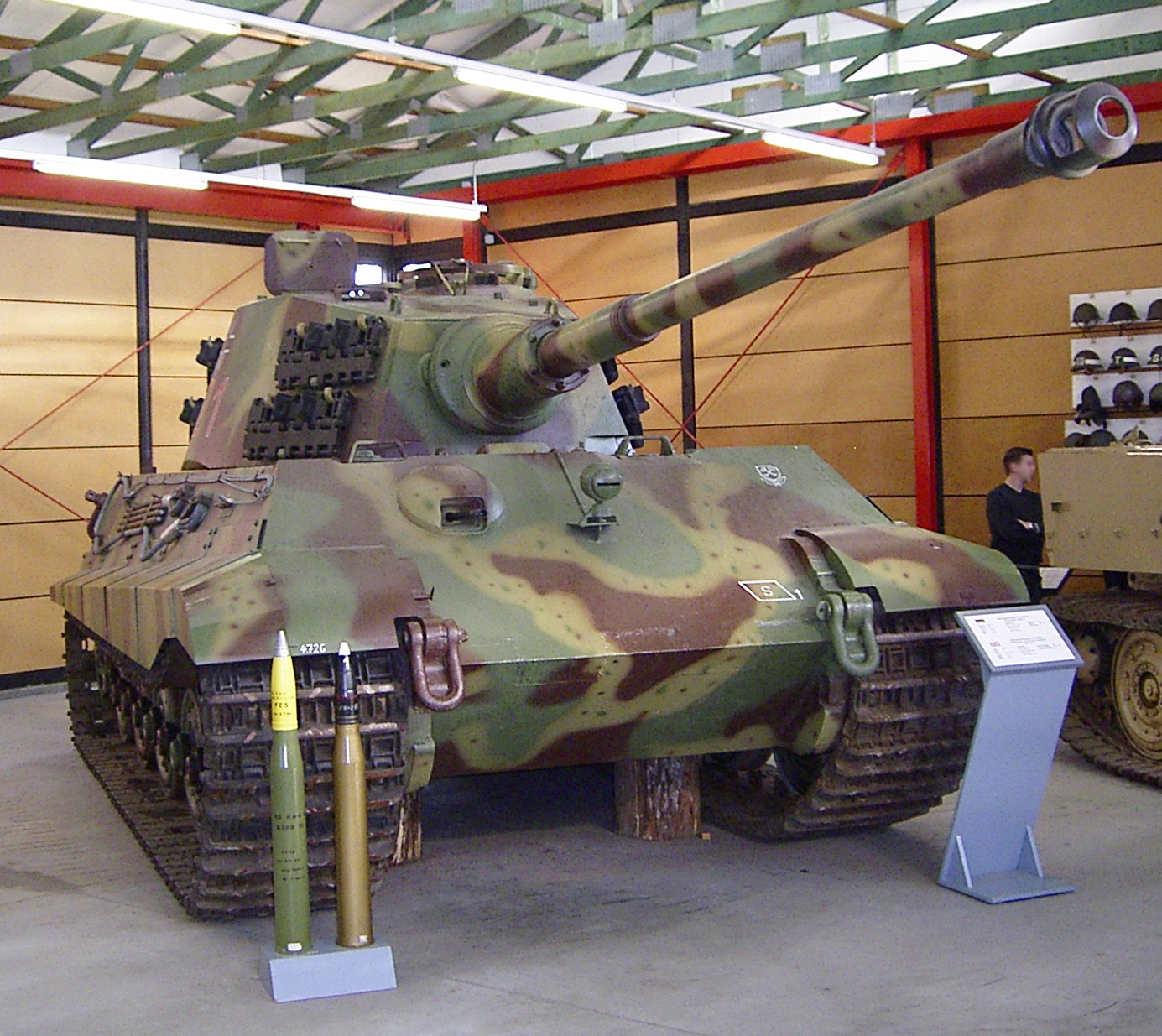
Panzer VI Ausf. B Tiger II

Notes:

- Tiger I (Panzer VI E/H, Sd.Kfz. 181) was armed with an 88 mm L/56 gun
- Sturmtiger - assault tank based on Tiger I chassis. Armed with 380 mm rocket mortar converted from battle damaged tanks
- Tiger II (Panzer VI B, Sd.Kfz. 182, also known as Königstiger) was armed with an 88 mm L/71 gun
- Jagdtiger (Sd.Kfz. 186) - Based on Tiger II chassis. Tank destroyer armed with a 128 mm PaK 44 gun (L/55)

== Ferdinand/Elefant ==
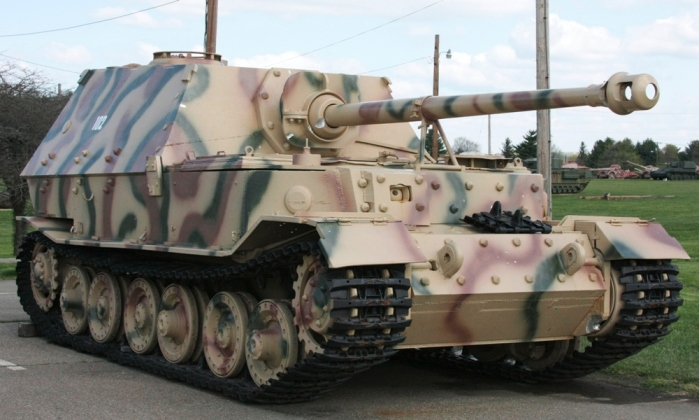
Elefant

The Ferdinand/Elefant (Sd.Kfz. 184, and known as Panzerjäger Tiger (P)) used the chassis of Porsche's VK 4501 (P) which had been produced before the design was rejected, due to its complex Porsche-designed powerplant, in favour of the Henschel design which became the Tiger. Two over-stressed Maybach HL120 water-cooled V-12 engines were installed instead to drive the generators and electric motors for the final drives. On top of this chassis, a forward-facing 88 mm L/71 gun was mounted.

	1943	1944
Ferdinand Sd.Kfz. 184	90+1 Prototype	
Elefant Sd.Kfz. 184		48 rebuilt from remaining Ferdinand

== Other vehicles ==
During the war, Germany produced:

- 3,024 reconnaissance vehicles
- 2,450 other armoured vehicles
- 21,880 armoured personnel carriers
- 36,703 semi-tracked tractors
- 87,329 semi-tracked trucks
- 347,490 military trucks and lorries
- 226,337 military cars
- 97,470 military motor-cycles
- 245,389 Train waggons

== Development of tank manufacturing ==
German manufacturing of tanks began in 1934, in violation of the Treaty of Versailles. German industry had not produced arms in many years, and time was required to develop the necessary techniques for hardening steel and for the development of tooling to produce arms. The first tank type produced was the two-man, Panzer I light tank, designed and produced by the Krupp works as a training vehicle. It was not designed for use in combat; instead, the main battle tank of the German army was to be the Panzer III but delays in its development and manufacture led to the production of an interim vehicle, the Panzer II, which began production the following year. It was not clear yet how tanks would be used in the next war, nor was it apparent that tank-versus-tank combat would be important; some military theorists envisioned tanks operating in support of infantry. The cavalry arm of the Heer saw the major function of tanks to be that of reconnaissance. This was in marked conflict with the ideas of the armoured warfare proponents of Germany, chiefly Heinz Guderian, Wilhelm Ritter von Thoma, and Walther von Reichenau. It was not until 1937–38 that the first Panzer III and Panzer IV medium tanks began to appear.

Noting that Germany was the third largest producer of automobiles in the world, Guderian projected that Germany would be competitive with its major adversaries, a rather optimistic projection since Germany had great difficulty replacing vehicle losses throughout the war, the United States had been considered a non-combatant, and it ignored Soviet production capacity.

Early in development the Heer settled on the concept of the tank having a commander who was in radio communication with his superiors. Thus the basic design of the main battle tanks called for a larger turret that would house the tank commander, gunner and loader, while a driver and a machine gunner were down in the hull. Guderian insisted on the tank commander being in radio communication with both his platoon and with the members of his own tank crew. Though the Panzer III was conceived as the main battle tank of the Wehrmacht, the Wehrmacht did not anticipate being at war with Europe's major powers in 1939, and few were available at the start of the war. Excluding Czech-built tanks, on 1 September 1939 the invasion of Poland was undertaken with the German armoured force of 3,195 tanks evenly split between the Pz I training tank and the Pz II light tank; of the main battle tanks, only 98 Pz IIIs were in service during the invasion of Poland, along with 211 Pz IVs, with 215 tanks of various models also available as command tanks after being modified by having their main armament removed and extra communications equipment installed.

== Manufacturing control ==
The production of tanks in Germany began in 1934. Due to the insertion of the Nazi Party into the procurement process and political considerations that had nothing to do with the goal of providing arms for the military, the companies that ended up gaining the contracts for tank production had limited actual experience in mass production. Ford and Opel, two manufacturers with considerable knowledge and ability in assembly line techniques, were not allowed to participate in the bidding process. Germany in general and the German tank production industry in particular was not prepared for the total war that Germany was entering in 1939. In contrast to the Messerschmitt Bf109 fighter aircraft, which was designed by Willy Messerschmitt with the production of large numbers of the aircraft in mind, tank design and production in Germany in 1939 was the work of craftsmen. German industry anticipated supporting the military in brief conflicts. A full commitment to war production was not made until the midpoint in the conflict. Surprisingly, civilian vehicle production was not set aside until 1943. By contrast British car companies switched to war production (making military transports, aircraft and tanks) at the start of the war and the United States halted production of civilian automobiles within two months of its entry into the war in late 1941, with autoplants converted to military-only production of arms, munitions, trucks, tanks and planes.

In the run up to the outbreak of war, the large companies engaged in tank production did not have space set aside for expanding their production lines. In consequence, unlike allied manufacturers, German tank manufacturers never came to a point where they were stockpiling and storing excess finished products. Though these companies did expand with the increased demand of the ongoing war, it was not until the assignment of Albert Speer as Minister of Armaments that true efforts were made to bring mass production techniques to the German tank production industry.

During the period before the war, all companies with the exception of Alkett (which was under the control of Rhine-Metal Borsig, a subsidiary of the government-controlled Hermann Göring Works) were privately owned stock companies with the stock available for purchase by the public. All these companies, with the exception again of Alkett, produced tanks in addition to their normal peacetime manufacture of trucks, locomotives, and other heavy equipment. From 1935 onward, the government progressively increased its control over industries engaged in rearmament. The Nazi Party's Four Year Plan introduced in 1936 placed Hermann Göring in leadership of the state's efforts to bring industry into state control. Through threat and coercion Göring was able to expand the Nazi Party's control of private industry involved in steel and armament production. By 1938, this control included the rationing of essential raw materials, factory inventories, labor hours, rates of pay, working conditions, building and machine tool expansion, plant locations and stock dividends. All companies were forced to join the Economic Board of the tank industry which handled all questions affecting the industry.

== Location of German tank manufacturing industry ==
The tank manufacturing industry in Germany was not concentrated in any one geographic location. Major plants were located in Nuremberg, Kassel, Brunswick, Magdeburg, and Berlin. There was, however, some geographical concentration of tank component manufacturers, such as engines and gears in Friedrichshafen, hulls, turrets, and guns in the Ruhr, rubber treads in Hanover, and instruments in Berlin. These locations, if interdicted, represented a potential chokepoint to German tank manufacturing.

== German tank problem ==
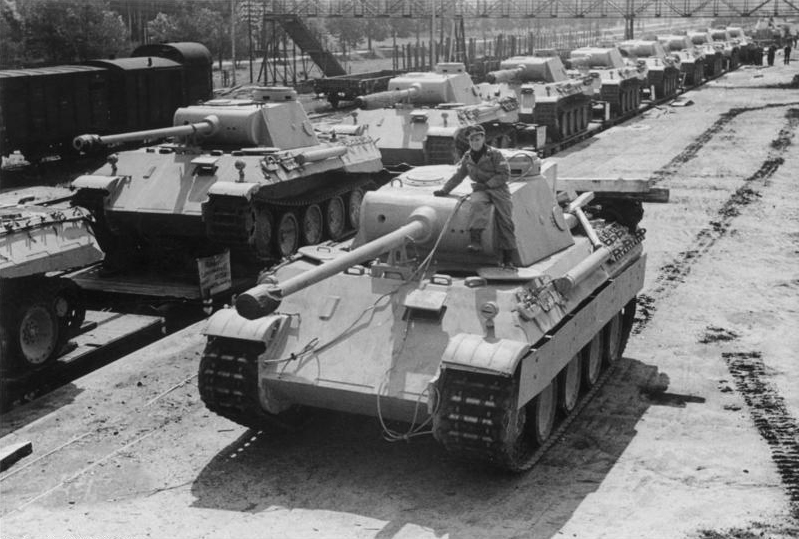
Panther tanks are loaded for transport to the front, 1943.

During the course of the war the Allies made sustained efforts to determine the extent of German productivity, and approached this in two major ways: conventional intelligence gathering and statistical estimation. In many cases statistical analysis substantially improved on conventional intelligence. In some cases conventional intelligence was used in conjunction with statistical methods, as was the case in estimation of Panther tank production just prior to D-Day.

The allied command structure had thought the Panther tanks seen in Italy were an unusual heavy tank, and would only be seen in northern France in small numbers, much the same way as the Tiger I was seen in Tunisia. The US Army was confident that the Sherman tank would perform well against the German "Mk III" and "IV" tanks which they expected to meet. (Note: An Armored Ground Forces policy statement of November 1943 concluded the following: "The recommendation of a limited proportion of tanks carrying a 90mm gun is not concurred in for the following reasons: The M4 tank has been hailed widely as the best tank of the battlefield today....There appears to be no fear on the part of our forces of the German Mark VI (Tiger) tank. There can be no basis for the T26 tank other than the conception of a tank-vs.-tank duel-which is believed to be unsound and unnecessary.") Shortly before the landings in northern France, rumours indicated that large numbers of Panther tanks were being used in the panzer divisions.

To ascertain if this were true the Allies attempted to estimate the number of Panther tanks being produced. To do this they made use of the serial numbers printed on captured or destroyed German tanks. The principal numbers used were gearbox numbers, as these fell in two unbroken sequences. Chassis and engine numbers were also used, though their use was more complicated. Various other components were used to cross-check the analysis. Similar analyses were done on tires, which were known to be sequentially numbered. The analysis of Panther tank wheels yielded an estimate for the number of wheel molds that were in use. A discussion with British road wheel makers then allowed the estimation of the number of wheels that could be produced from this many molds. This in turn yielded the total number of Panthers that were being produced each month. Analysis of road wheels from the two tanks obtained yielded an estimate of 270 Panthers produced in February 1944 alone, substantially more than had previously been suspected.

German records after the war showed production for the month of February 1944 was 276. The statistical approach proved to be far more accurate than conventional intelligence methods, and the phrase "German tank problem" became accepted as a descriptor for the statistical analysis used.

== See also ==
- List of German combat vehicles of World War II
- German tanks in World War II
- German aircraft production during World War II
- Military production during World War II
- French armoured fighting vehicle production during World War II
- Soviet armored fighting vehicle production during World War II
- British armoured fighting vehicle production during World War II
- American armored fighting vehicle production during World War II

== Bibliography ==
- Bond, Brian, Liddell Hart: A Study of his Military Thought. London: Cassell, 1977.
- Chamberlain, Peter and Hilary L Doyle Encyclopedia Of German Tanks Of World War Two London: Arms & Armour, 1999.
- Doyle, Hilary L; Thomas L Jentz; Tony Bryan Panzerkampfwagen IV Ausf.G, H and J 1942-45 Oxford: Osprey, 2001.
- Guderian, Heinz (1937). Achtung-Panzer! (1999 reissue ed.). London: Wellington House.
- Guderian, Heinz (1952). Panzer Leader. New York: Da Capo. ISBN 0-306-81101-4.
- Hahn, Fritz Waffen und Geheimwaffen des deutschen Heeres 1933 – 1945 Koblenz: Bernard & Graefe, 1987.(in German)
- Liddell Hart, B.H., The German Generals Talk. New York, NY: Morrow, 1948.
- Lucas, James World War Two through German Eyes. New York, NY: Sterling, 1987. ISBN 0-85368-831-1
- Ogorkiewicz, Richard Armour : the development of mechanized forces and their equipment. London : Stevens & Sons, 1960. ISBN
- Ruggles, Richard; Brodie, Henry (1947). "An Empirical Approach to Economic Intelligence in World War II". Journal of the American Statistical Association. 42 (237): 72–91. doi:10.2307/2280189. ISSN 0162-1459. JSTOR 2280189.
- Panzertruppen Berlin: Militärverlag der DDR, 1974.(in German)
