= American armored fighting vehicle production during World War II =

Detailing production statistics of American armored fighting vehicles in World War II

This page details tank production by the United States of America during World War II.

== Light tanks ==
=== Stuart series ===
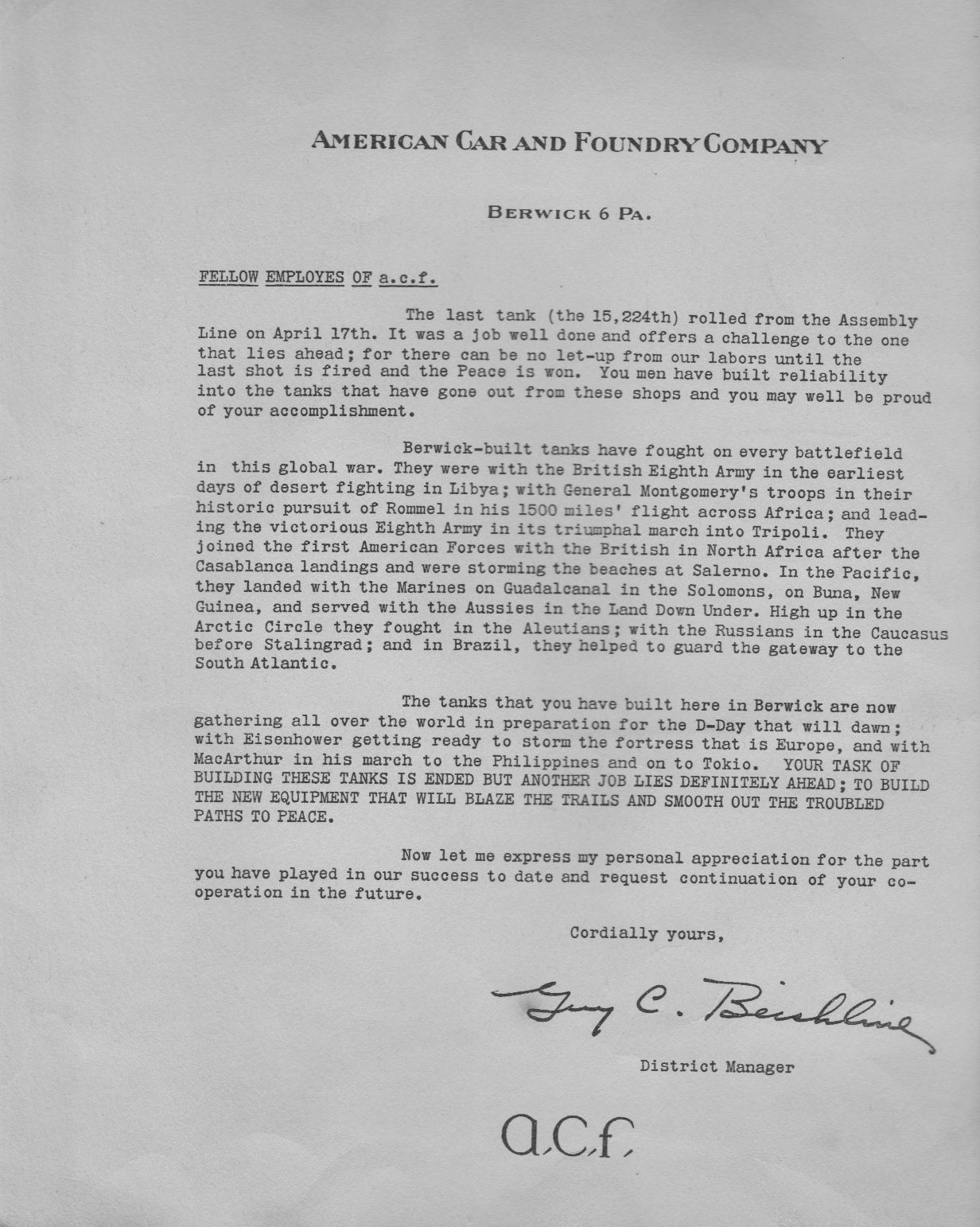
Letter sent to workers at the ACF plant in Berwick, Pennsylvania to commemorate the end of M2, M3 and M5 tank production at the plant in 1944.

By the time the United States entered the Second World War in December 1941 it had only two tank designs ready for combat: the M1 Combat Car and the M2 Light Tank. Originally both tanks only came equipped with machine guns but in 1940, the M2A4 was upgraded to a 37mm anti-tank gun. The machine gun-armed tanks were never used in combat, and only a handful of cannon-armed vehicles saw service in the Pacific; but their design formed the basis of the later M3/M5 Light Tank. The British officially called their M3s Stuarts, and often referred to them as "Honeys".

	1940	1941	1942	1943	1944	1945	Total
M1	34	-	-	-	-	-	34
M2	325	40	10	-	-	-	375
M3	-	2,551	7,839	3,469	-	-	13,859
M5 & M8 HMC	-	-	2,825	4,063	1,963	-	8,851
Total	359	2,591	10,674	7,532	1,963	-	23,119

Notes:

- M1 = M1 Combat Car, machine gun
- M2 = M2 Light Tank, 37 mm gun
- M3/M5 = M3 Light Tank, 37 mm gun
- M8 HMC = M8 Howitzer Motor Carriage, 75 mm M2 or M3 howitzer on M5 hull

=== Other light AFVs ===
The M22 Locust was specially designed to British requirements as an airmobile tank, to be delivered to the battlefield by glider. Production was delayed and by the time it entered service, it was considered obsolete.

The M24 Chaffee was intended as a replacement for the M3 and M5 series;

	1940	1941	1942	1943	1944	1945	Total
M22 Locust	-	-	-	680	150	-	830
M24 Chaffee	-	-	-	-	1,930	2,801	4,731
M18 Hellcat	-	-	-	812	1,695	-	2,507
Total	-	-	-	1,492	3,775	2,801	8,068

- Light Tank M22 Locust, 37 mm M6 gun
- Light Tank M24 Chaffee, 75 mm M6 gun
- M18 Gun Motor Carriage, also known as the Hellcat, was a tank destroyer armed with a 76 mm M1 gun

== Medium tanks and AFVs ==
In 1939, the USA had manufactured 18 examples of the Medium M2 tank. This tank was never to see combat service, but its chassis and suspension were used as a basis for the Lee and Sherman tanks. Following the German invasion of France in 1940, a small number of Medium M2A1 tanks (an improved model) were manufactured for training. A better tank (which was eventually to become the Medium M3 Lee) was designed as an interim until the M4 could be produced. The M3 was ordered in large numbers by the British to a slightly different specification but by the time Lend-Lease was introduced the two variants were more alike except for the turret. Over half of M3 production would be supplied to the US's allies - the UK and USSR.

The Lee was superseded by the Medium M4 Sherman. This originally carried a 75 mm gun; later versions of the Sherman were armed with a 76 mm gun or a 105 mm howitzer.

On the Sherman hull, the M10 and M36 tank destroyers (officially called "Gun Motor Carriages") were produced.

The M7 Howitzer Motor Carriage was originally built on the M3 medium tank chassis, but later versions were built on the similar M4 tank chassis.

	1940	1941	1942	1943	1944	1945	Total
M2A1	6	88	-	-	-	-	94
M3	-	1,342	4,916	-	-	-	6,258
M4	-	-	8,017	21,231	3,504	651	33,403
M4 (76)	-	-	-	-	7,135	3,748	10,883
M4 (105)	-	-	-	-	2,286	2,394	4,680
M10 GMC	-	-	639	6,067	-	-	6,706
M36 GMC	-	-	-	-	1,400	924	2,324
M7 HMC	-	-	2,028	786	1,164	338	4,316
M12 GMC	-	-	60	40	-	-	100
M30 Cargo Carrier	-	-	60	40	-	-	100
Total	6	1,430	15,720	28,164	15,489	8,055	68,864

Notes:

- M2A1 = Medium M2A1
- M3 = Medium M3 Lee/Grant. The US version in British service was the Lee (named after General Lee); the British specification version (a different turret) was the Grant (named after General Grant).
- M4 = Medium M4 Sherman with 75 mm M3 (L/38) gun
- M4 (76) = Medium M4 Sherman with 76 mm M1-series gun
- M4 (105) = Medium M4 Sherman with 105 mm howitzer
- M10 GMC = M10 Gun Motor Carriage with 3" M7 gun
- M36 GMC = M36 Gun Motor Carriage with 90 mm M1 gun
- M7 HMC = M7 Howitzer Motor Carriage, M3 (Grant) or M4 (Sherman) hull with 105 mm howitzer in forward-facing mount. Given the service name "Priest" by the British.
- M12 GMC = M12 Gun Motor Carriage, M3 (Grant) hull with 155 mm M1918 gun in forward-facing mount
- M30 Cargo Carrier, ammunition carrier for M12 GMC.

== Heavy tanks ==
The Pershing heavy tank (named after General Pershing) was the only heavy tank used in combat by the US armed forces during World War II. An earlier design, the Heavy Tank M6, was not accepted for large scale production and only 40 were produced. Work began in early 1945 to develop a significantly heavier variant of the M26 Pershing, the T32 Heavy Tank, but after the end of the World War II, the project was cancelled and the four prototype vehicles were scrapped.

	1940	1941	1942	1943	1944	1945	Total
Heavy M26 Pershing (90 mm M3 gun)	-	-	-		40	2,162	2,202

== All types and derivatives ==
American tank production, 1937–1944
1937	1938	1939	1940	1941	1942	1943	1944	Total
150	99	18	365	4,021	26,608	37,198	20,357	88,816

== See also ==
- Other countries' production figures
  - British armoured fighting vehicle production during World War II
  - French armoured fighting vehicle production during World War II
  - German armored fighting vehicle production during World War II
  - Soviet armored fighting vehicle production during World War II
- United States aircraft production during World War II
