= German aircraft production during World War II =

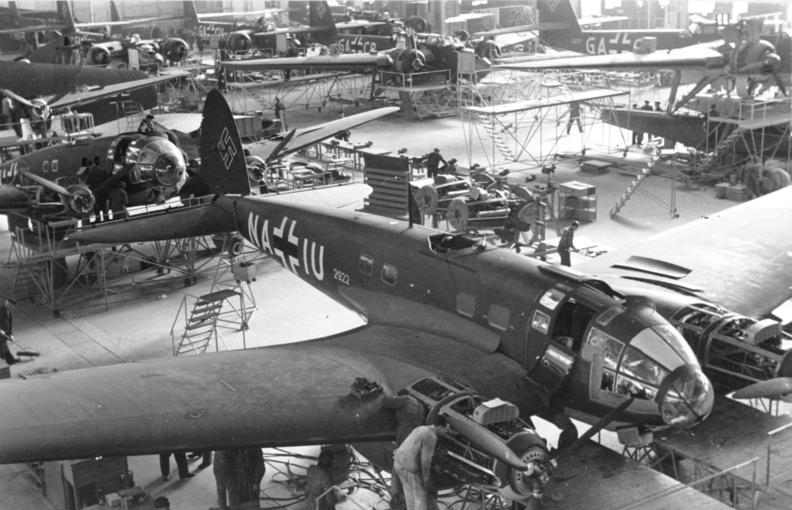
He 111 production in 1939

The following is a list of aircraft production by Germany during World War II by type and year. Note that some figures may not be accurate, and it is not comprehensive. Aircraft variants of different roles are listed separately. Related types are listed next to each other; see RLM aircraft designation system for an explanation.

Bomber aircraft
Type	1939	1940	1941	1942	1943	1944	1945	Total
Arado Ar 234	-	-	-	-	-	150	64	214
Dornier Do 17	215	260	-	-	-	-	-	475
Dornier Do 217	1	20	277	564	504	-	-	1,366
Heinkel He 111	452	756	950	1337	1405	756	-	5,656
Heinkel He 177	-	-	-	166	415	565	-	1,146
Junkers Ju 88	69	1816	2146	2270	2160	661	-	9,122
Junkers Ju 188	-	-	-	-	165	301	-	466
Junkers Ju 388	-	-	-	-	-	4	-	4
Total	737	2852	3373	4337	4799	2351	-	18,499
Fighter aircraft
Type	1939	1940	1941	1942	1943	1944	1945	Total
Dornier Do 17	9	-	-	-	-	-	-	9
Dornier Do 217	-	-	-	-	157	207	-	364
Dornier Do 335	-	-	-	-	-	7	4	11
Focke-Wulf Fw 190	-	-	228	1850	2171	7488	1630	13,376
Focke-Wulf Ta 152	-	-	-	-	-	34	?	~150
Focke-Wulf Ta 154	-	-	-	-	-	8	-	8
Heinkel He 162	-	-	-	-	-	-	116	116
Heinkel He 219	-	-	-	-	11	195	62	268
Junkers Ju 88	-	62	66	257	706	2513	355	3,964
Messerschmitt Bf 109	449	1667	2764	2657	6013	12807	2798	29,155
Messerschmitt Bf 110	156	1006	594	501	641	128	-	3,028
Messerschmitt Me 163	-	-	-	-	-	327	37	364
Messerschmitt Me 210	-	-	92	93	89	74	-	348
Messerschmitt Me 262	-	-	-	-	-	564	730	1,294
Messerschmitt Me 410	-	-	-	-	271	629	-	910
Total	614	2735	3744	5358	10059	24981	5732	53,215
Ground attack aircraft
Type	1939	1940	1941	1942	1943	1944	1945	Total
Focke-Wulf Fw 190	-	-	-	68	1183	4279	1104	6,634
Henschel Hs 129	-	-	7	221	411	302	-	841
Junkers Ju 87	134	603	500	960	1672	1012	-	4,881
Junkers Ju 88	-	-	-	-	-	3	-	3
Total	134	603	507	1249	3266	5596	1104	12359
Reconnaissance aircraft
Type	1939	1940	1941	1942	1943	1944	1945	Total
Dornier Do 17	16	-	-	-	-	-	-	16
Dornier Do 215	3	92	6	-	-	-	-	101
Focke-Wulf Fw 189	6	38	250	327	208	17	-	846
Focke-Wulf Fw 200	1	36	58	84	76	8	-	263
Henschel Hs 126	137	368	5	-	-	-	-	510
Junkers Ju 88	-	330	568	567	394	52	-	1,911
Junkers Ju 188	-	-	-	-	105	432	33	570
Junkers Ju 290	-	-	-	-	23	18	-	41
Junkers Ju 388	-	-	-	-	-	87	12	99
Messerschmitt Bf 109	-	-	26	8	141	979	171	1,328
Messerschmitt Bf 110	-	75	190	79	150	-	-	494
Messerschmitt Me 210	-	-	2	2	-	-	-	4
Messerschmitt Me 410	-	-	-	-	20	93	-	113
Total	163	939	1105	1067	1117	1686	216	6296
Seaplanes
Type	1939	1940	1941	1942	1943	1944	1945	Total
Arado Ar 196	22	104	94	107	104	-	-	435
Blohm & Voss BV 138	39	82	85	70	-	-	-	276
Blohm & Voss BV 222	-	-	-	-	4	-	-	4
Dornier Do 18	22	49	-	-	-	-	-	71
Dornier Do 24	-	1	7	46	81	-	-	135
Heinkel He 115	52	76	-	-	141	-	-	269
Total	135	312	186	223	330			1190
Transport aircraft
Type	1939	1940	1941	1942	1943	1944	1945	Total
Gotha Go 244	-	-	-	43	-	-	-	43
Junkers Ju 52	145	388	507	503	887	379	-	2,809
Junkers Ju 252	-	-	-	15	-	-	-	15
Junkers Ju 352	-	-	-	-	1	49	-	50
Messerschmitt Me 323	-	-	-	27	140	34	-	201
Total	145	388	507	588	1028	462		3118
Total production
Year	1939	1940	1941	1942	1943	1944	1945	Total
Total	1,928	7,829	9,422	12,822	20,599	35,076	7,052	94,677

== See also ==
- German armored fighting vehicle production during World War II
- List of World War II military aircraft of Germany
- World War II aircraft production
- Military production during World War II
