= British armoured fighting vehicle production during World War II =

This article lists British armoured fighting vehicle production during the Second World War. The United Kingdom produced 27,528 tanks and self-propelled guns from July 1939 to May 1945, as well as 26,191 armoured cars and 69,071 armoured personnel carriers (mostly the Universal Carrier).

== Tank design and production ==
British tank design focused on pre-war requirements for light, cruiser, and infantry tanks created experimentally by J.F.C. Fuller, Percy Hobart and B.H. Liddell-Hart. Their experiments and doctrine led the way in the development of armoured warfare after the first world war, and also had a major influence on Axis development under Heinz Guderian until the outbreak of hostilities. Requirements were raised by Lieutenant General Sir Giffard Le Quesne Martel.

These types were joined later in the war by requirement for a heavier Assault tank, and eventually the Universal tank expected to replace the Cruiser and Infantry tanks. Neither entered production. Light tanks had mostly been discounted by the start of the war in all roles except airborne (generally replaced with the Carrier). As a result, the majority of British wartime tank production focused on the Cruiser and Infantry types.

=== Roles and responsibilities ===
Prior to 1936, tank design and production came under the responsibility of the Master General of the Ordnance, who appointed a Director of Mechanisation. The Director of Mechanisation led the Mechanisation Board who represented the various user arms combined to lead the production of tanks and vehicles.

Before the war, the Master General of the Ordnance post (and its holder -General Hugh Elles) had been replaced by Leslie Hore-Belisha, the Secretary of State for War, and Director General of Munitions Production. In 1939 this post was now part of the new Ministry of Supply. As works within the Ministry of Supply scaled up, a new Director General of Tanks and Transport, Peter Bennett, took on the capability of design leadership, and in 1940 added a Controller of Mechanisation (Major-General A.E. Davidson) to supervise the Mechanisation Board, working as before.

In May 1940 the War Cabinet had been established, and formed the Tank Board to investigate and resolve tank design and production problems. The Director General of Tanks and Transport was replaced (now Geoffrey Burton) and now led a Director of Armoured Fighting Vehicles (representing the War Office), and separate Director of Design (A.A.M. Durant) and Director of Production. Under Durant's new Directorate of Tank Design a new Department of Tank Design (DTD) was formed to design the tanks.

The DTD was formed rapidly from available technicians, in many cases lacking experience and lacking in production facilities, while a large number of projects based on General Staff requirements were underway. As such, tank design was increasingly reliant on industry experience and capabilities within Vickers, Vauxhall, Leyland Motors, Nuffield, and later Rolls-Royce.

In 1941 the Tank Board was further re-organized to include a Director of Artillery and representatives from the General Staff.

As 1941 progressed, with development of greater horsepower tank engines, greater stresses were placed on many of the tank components. Rolls-Royce, aided by Leyland and Vauxhall, started to become more involved in improving the design of a greater array of tank components, increasing performance and reliability. This saw the transition from work on an improved Crusader tank, the Cavalier tank, to development of the new Cromwell tank. Rolls-Royce created the Rolls-Royce Meteor, and set its pre-war car design team to work in improving tank design to enable its use.

Later in 1941, the DTD was transferred to the Controller General of Research and Development within the Ministry of Supply. This marked a major change in the focus of the design team. At this stage the DTD began to take on a co-ordinating role. It produced specifications and commissioned pilot models for each tank to assess different companies. One competing company would then be appointed the design lead for further development of that tank. This followed a similar pattern to the RAF's Air Ministry Specifications.

In November 1941, W A Robotham, the Chief Engineer of Rolls-Royce's Chassis Division who had been the main proponent of the Cromwell and Meteor works was seconded into the Ministry of Supply to become the Chief Engineer of Tank Design. Robotham started a fresh look at tank design, starting with welded hulls and final delivery of the 6-pounder anti-tank gun. The role was outside of the usual hierarchy, allowing Robotham to co-ordinate efforts between DTD and industry while adding some much needed technical advice to the Tank Board and General Staff.

In 1942, the Chairman of the AFV Division (Viscount Weir) was appointed as the Chief Executive for Tank Design, and became the chairman of the Tank Board. The Tank Board was reorganised to provide equal representation from Ministry of Supply and the War Office, consisting of:

War Office
Deputy Chief of the Imperial General Staff (Lt. Gen. Ronald Weeks)
Assistant Chief of the Imperial General Staff (Major General Daril Watson)
Director of Armoured Fighting Vehicles (Major General Alexander W. C. Richardson)
Director of Mechanical Engineering (Maj. Gen. Eric Rowcroft)
Ministry of Supply
Chief Executive for Tank Design, (and chairman) (Viscount Weir)
Chairman of the Supply Council (Sir William Rootes)
Controller General of Research and Development (Mr. Oliver Lucas), later as "Director-General of Fighting Vehicles (Research and Development)"
Chief Engineer of Tank Design (Mr. W A Robotham)
Others
USA Liaison Colonel G. A. Green, (of W. Averell Harriman's staff).

Following the fall of France, US contribution to the war effort became crucial. In early 1942 a Tank Mission was established and sent to the US to exchange information on AFV design, comprising Lucas, Robotham, George Usher (Controller of Tank Production), Weeks and Richardson. The greater manufacturing capacity in the USA resulted in US-made tanks providing the bulk of forces, while US designers, newer to the business of tank design, benefited from British experience.

The Tank Board stayed in similar configuration for the rest of the war, although individuals filling the roles varied. As 1942 progressed, Viscount Weir was replaced by Commander Robert Micklem RN of Vickers as Chief Executive of Tank Design. Archie Boyd replaced George Usher as Controller of Tank Production. Claude Gibb was appointed Director-General of Armoured Fighting Vehicles, although Lucas continued to work under him.

In August 1943, Robotham stepped down as CETD, returning to Rolls-Royce. In 1944 the Directorate of Tank Design returned to designing its own tanks, creating the Centurion tank ready for delivery in late 1945.

=== Cruiser tanks ===
At the start of the war, the Cruiser Mk IV was the current model of Cruiser tank based on a second version of the A13 specification.

The Crusader and Covenanter were parallel designs for a cheaper cruiser tank than the A16 design proposed to replace the Cruiser Mark IV. Both designs were ordered in 1939 prior to the start of the war. The first tanks were delivered in 1940. Covenanter never achieved combat readiness, and was used for training in the UK. Crusader was used extensively in North Africa, but suffered from problems with reliability and insufficient numbers were able to be fielded, many returning to workshops for servicing. Works to replace the Crusader continued in Britain, but when its successors were delayed the Crusader was modified to take the 6-pounder gun.

In parallel, Britain started to look at US made tanks to meet the Cruiser requirement, initially requesting the US to build Crusaders. This request was denied as the US tank programme was focussed on producing their own tanks of similar class, the M2 Medium. This fitted the same 37mm weapon as the M3 Light Tank (Stuart) which was already in British service. British experience of the 37mm gun had been underwhelming, and the M2 Medium was turned down. The next version, M3 Medium (later known as Lee/Grant in British service) was already part way through design and had a turret too small for the larger 75mm gun. To meet British requirements, the design was modified to add a larger gun in a side sponson. British needs were then added to the M4 Medium (Sherman) requirements. Both tanks were produced in greater numbers, and Sherman gained the unofficial moniker "heavy cruiser".

The tanks that received the names Cavalier, Centaur and Cromwell were all designs to meet the same requirement for a cruiser tank to replace the Crusader tank. Design work took place in 1941 and 1942, focussed primarily on developments in engine and transmission technologies. The A24 Cavalier and A27L Centaur used the Nuffield Liberty engine while the A27M Cromwell used the more powerful Rolls-Royce Meteor.

When US tanks entered British use, the Cromwell and Centaur design requirement was changed to move from the 6-pounder to 75mm for commonality of ammunition. This reduced the armour penetration. An uprated 75mm High Velocity gun was designed to overcome the issue, but proved too large for the new tanks, placing a renewed focus on the 17-pounder. Cromwell was first used in action with the Normandy landings in June 1944.

The A30 Cruiser Mk VIII Challenger was created as a derivative of Cromwell to meet the needs for a 17-pounder armed cruiser tank, but production was curtailed when a modification to the Sherman, Sherman Firefly, proved easier to produce. This allowed tank production to re-focus on Cromwell and the new Comet design.

A34 Comet improved on Cromwell. It mounted a further upgrade to the High Velocity gun that previously couldn't be fitted to Cromwell, now made capable of firing 17pounder (nominally 77mm) projectiles. It replaced the need for Challenger.

Specification and design of the A41 Centurion began in 1943, also initially mounting the 17-pounder. It entered service just as the war came to an end.

=== Infantry tanks ===
At the start of the war, the Matilda I was the current infantry tank, while the Matilda II was in production based on the A12 specification of 1936 and the A12E1 prototype of 1938. This entered service early in 1940. It was supplemented by the Valentine tank, based on Cruiser designs and the Matilda I. The Valentine was a private venture. It did not have a specification number. Design approval was granted just as war broke out in 1939. It was rushed into service to replace losses in the Dunkirk evacuations.

Work on the Churchill infantry tank had begun before the war began, with specification A20. This developed into the A22 specification when France was lost, and frontline requirements changed. A22 had rapid development, with design completed around one month after the specification was released. Tanks began rolling off the production line a year later. The rushed design left a number of faults, and the vehicle was expected to be replaced with the T14 assault tank ordered from (and designed in collaboration with) the US in 1942. Parallel development of the A33 Excelsior heavy assault tank was proposed following the Dieppe raid. Both were cancelled when faults with the Churchill were rectified, and the vehicle proved capable of meeting battlefield requirements.

A43 Black Prince was later developed from the Churchill, design commencing in 1943, to be armed with the 17-pounder. By the time it was ready for production (early 1945) the Sherman Firefly and Comet had overcome the immediate need for 17-pounder armed tanks, while the new Centurion offered similar protection in a more agile cruiser tank configuration. Production was cancelled, and with Centurion (and the Universal tank concept) now replacing the need for separate Cruiser and Infantry tanks, this marked the end of the Infantry tank line.

== Tank nomenclature ==
British tank designs and the tanks produced were identified by General Staff specification, tank type, the mark (either of type, or of specific model), a service name, and version.

For example, the A27M specification for a cruiser tank entered service as 'Tank, Cruiser, Mark VIII' (the eighth cruiser design to see service) with the service name 'Cromwell' and was produced in eight variants – Cromwell I to VIII. A related design but with a different engine – specification A27L – was the 'Tank, Cruiser, Mark VIII Centaur'

This means that vehicles may be referenced in part or whole by combination of those elements.

=== Specification number ===
General Staff specification was a reference to the requirements developed by the Directorate of Tank Design e.g. A13. These were specifications for which new tanks were to be designed.

Not all specifications led to vehicles being put into production. More than one design could be drawn up to a single specification and hence more than one tank produced to the same specification. If the vehicle was privately developed it may not have a General Staff number at all.

A significant redesign could lead to the issue of a new specification number without a new Mark, for instance the Infantry Tank Mark IV Churchill – originally built to specification A22 in 1940 – underwent a redesign leading to a better armoured vehicle the Churchill VII. This improved design was first known as A22F then renumbered as A42.

=== Type name and mark ===
Secondly by a descriptive name, as with other equipment in the British Army – e.g. "Tank, Infantry, Mark II". This reflected the type and model of tank, i.e. "Tank, Infantry, Mark II" is a different tank to "Tank, Infantry, Mark III".

The scheme was introduced during the First World War but not always applied to earlier designs. The descriptive name could also be modified by the inclusion of "A" denoting an armament change or "*" denoting some other change.

=== Service name ===
Thirdly by a name for this model of tank – e.g. Crusader. This could have a number associated for the version of this model of tank, e.g. Crusader II is the second variant or Mark to the Crusader I.

Some tanks had already picked up names, either nicknames or from project names, but in June 1941 the Prime Minister Winston Churchill asked that all tanks be named.

The number can be used for upgrades to the tank (synonymous with a second Mark designation), but can also be used for different capability packages, for instance the fitting of a different gun or engine. This isn't necessarily a refinement or improvement, it's simply adapted to a different need or manufacturing technique. They are all based on the same design of tank however, whereas the mark of tank is applied to evolutions of the tank design/specification.

For example, Valentine and Churchill both mounted a series of different turrets, some of which were improvements, while others were different methods of manufacturing. Valentine was fitted with both petrol and diesel engines determined by availability and manufacturer. Cromwell and Churchill tanks mounted the 75 mm gun and 95 mm howitzer for different purposes. All were given different numbers to identify the different variants.

== Tank production by model ==
=== Tank, Infantry, Mk I, Matilda I (A11) ===
The Matilda I was a machine gun armed infantry support tank. It had been built down to a price and for quick delivery. Those not lost during the fighting of the battle of France were abandoned at Dunkirk. The few left in the UK were retained for training only.

Total production 1937–40: 140.

=== Tank, Infantry, Mk II, Matilda II (A12) ===
The Matilda II was produced by Vulcan Foundry, John Fowler & Co., Ruston & Hornsby, the London, Midland and Scottish Railway, Harland and Wolff, and the North British Locomotive Company. As well as Marks I, II, III, IV and V of the Matilda, some were rebuilt with the Canal Defence Light

Total production 1937–43: 2,987.

=== Tank, Infantry, Mk III, Valentine ===
Valentine was a private development by Vickers that was accepted by the War Office. It used the suspension of their pre-war A10 Heavy Cruiser design with heavier armour. There were eleven marks of Valentine.

Total production 1939–45 of Valentine Mks I, II, III and IV: 8,275.

=== Tank, Infantry, Mk IV, Churchill (A22) ===
Total production 1941-45: 5,768

=== Tank, Light, Mk VI ===
Tank production : 1,682 tanks between 1936 and 1940

=== Tank, Light, Mk VII, Tetrarch (A17) ===
Total production: 177.

=== Tank, Cruiser, Mk I, (A9) ===
Total production: 125.

=== Tank, Cruiser, Mk II, (A10) ===
Total production 1938–40: 175.

=== Tank, Cruiser, Mk III, (A13) ===
Total production 1938–39: 65.

=== Tank, Cruiser, Mk IV, (A13 Mk II) ===
The initial production of the Mark IV was by adding extra armour to Mark III. Later production included the extra armour at the time of construction. On top of those converted from the Mk III, 665 of the Mk IVA (with the BESA rather than a Vickers machine gun) were built.

=== Tank, Cruiser, Mk V, Covenanter (A13 Mk III) ===
The Covenanter was an unsuccessful design; a result of suffering from engine cooling problems. Total production: 1,700. No A13 Mk III saw combat as all but one (which was sent to North Africa) were stationed in Great Britain during the war and used for training.

=== Tank, Cruiser, Mk VI, Crusader (A15) ===
The last production Crusaders were produced without turrets as they were to be converted to artillery tractors or self-propelled anti-aircraft guns.

Total production 1940–43 of Crusader Mks I, II and III: 5,300.

=== Tank, Cruiser, Mk VII, Cavalier (A24) ===
Total production 1941–43: 500.

=== Tank, Cruiser, Mk VIII, Centaur (A27L) ===
Total production 1942–43: 950.

=== Tank, Cruiser, Mk VIII, Cromwell (A27M) ===
Cromwell was produced in several marks: I, III (II was a design that did not proceed to production), IV, IVw, Vw, VI, VII, VIIw, VIII. Some of these were reworks of earlier Cromwells, some of reworked Centaurs.

Total Production 1943–44 3,066

=== Tank, Cruiser, Mk VIII, Challenger (A30) ===
Total production 1943–44: 200.

=== Tank, Cruiser, Comet I (A34) ===
Total production 1944–45: 1,186.

=== Tank, Cruiser, Centurion I (A41) ===
Total production 1944–45:- 6.

== Carrier design and production ==
Two types of Carrier were produced.

- Loyd Carriers were based on the mechanical components of a Fordson 7V truck married to an armoured, tracked body.
- Bren and Scout Carriers were based on the Carden Loyd tankette and experience of the Dragon artillery tractor, but still used commercially available truck components for ease of manufacture.

Both types commenced design prior to the war.

The Bren, Scout and Cavalry carriers had the same chassis but there were differences in superstructure and fitted for different roles. They were succeeded by an improved Universal type capable of handling multiple roles and most production was of this Universal Carrier. As the war progressed the Universal Carriers became one of the most numerous armoured vehicles on the battlefield, with some estimates stating as many as 200,000 produced.

Loyd carriers were solely built in Britain, while Universal types were manufactured across the British Commonwealth, with a significant number coming from Canada. A version was also produced in the US, the T16.

== Carrier production by model ==
Loyd Carrier

Number and Mark for Loyd carriers were determined by the engine and brake system used.

- Carrier, Tracked, Personnel Carrying, No.1 Mk. I & II
- Carrier, Tracked, Personnel Carrying, No.2 Mk. I & II
- Carrier, Tracked, Personnel Carrying, No.2A Mk. I & II
- Carrier, Tracked, Personnel Carrying, No.3 Mk. I & II
- Carrier, Tracked, Starting and Charging, No.1 Mk. I
- Carrier, Tracked, Starting and Charging, No.2 Mk. I
- Carrier, Tracked, Starting and Charging, No.2A Mk. I
- Carrier, Tracked, Starting and Charging, No.3 MK. I
- Carrier, Tracked, Towing, No.1 Mk. I & II
- Carrier, Tracked, Towing, No.2 Mk. I & II
- Carrier, Tracked, Towing, No.2A Mk. I & II
- Carrier, Tracked, Towing, No.3 Mk. I & II
- Carrier, Tracked, Towing, No.1Z Mk. II
- Carrier, Tracked, Towing, No.2Z Mk. II
- Carrier, Tracked, Towing, No.2AZ Mk. II
- Carrier, Tracked, Towing, No.3 Mk. II

Universal Carrier and predecessor models

- Carrier, MMG No.1 Mk.I & II
- Carrier, MMG No.2 Mk.I & II
- Carrier, MMG No.2A Mk.I & II
- Carrier MMG No.3 Mk.I & II
- Carrier, 3in Mortar No.1 Mk.I & II
- Carrier, 3in Mortar No.2 Mk.I & II
- Carrier, 3in Mortar No.2A Mk.I & II
- Carrier, 3in Mortar No.3 Mk.I & II
- Carrier Universal No. 1 Mk. I, II & III, 113,000 produced
- Carrier Universal No. 2 Mk. I, II & III
- Carrier Universal No. 2A Mk. I, II & III
- Carrier Universal No. 3 Mk. I, II & III
- Carrier A.O.P No. 1 Mk. III
- Carrier A.O.P No. 2 Mk. III
- Carrier A.O.P No. 2A Mk. III
- Carrier A.O.P No. 3 Mk. III

== Armoured cars ==
Armoured car design and production ran through two distinct development cycles. Early armoured cars were built on the basis of armouring bodies to fit onto normal commercial car (light) and truck (heavy) chassis'. This involved some elements of compromise as the body had to fit an existing shape or size, while the weight shifted with heavy armour and weaponry. Immediately prior to the war, this changed with vehicles such as the Dingo designed from the start for armoured use. Such vehicles provided better handling, along with removing many compromises in design caused by the inherited chassis.

Scout cars

- Daimler Dingo (6,626)
- Humber scout car (4,300)

Light reconnaissance cars

- Humber light reconnaissance car
- Morris light reconnaissance car

Armoured cars

- AEC armoured car (629 produced 1942–1943)
- Coventry armoured car (220)
- Daimler armoured car (2,694)
- Guy armoured car (101)
- Humber armoured car (5,400)
- Lanchester armoured car
- Morris CS9 (99)
- Standard Beaverette

== Self-propelled guns ==
The rapid manoeuvre warfare practiced in the North African Campaign led to a requirement for a self-propelled artillery vehicle. This could relocate faster with the flow of battle, compared with traditional field guns. The principle of portee, carrying anti-tank guns on the back of trucks was limited to smaller calibres. The first armoured vehicles were brought into action at the battle of El Alamein and development continued throughout the war.

As the war progressed, self-propelled artillery saw further development in an anti-armour role, with the Archer and Achilles mounting 17-pounder guns. This can be compared with the American "tank destroyer" concept, but in British and Commonwealth use remained with the Royal Artillery. Following the war this transferred to the Royal Armoured Corps and ultimately was replaced with tanks in the same role.

=== Service names ===
Ecclesiastical names were chosen for self-propelled artillery. The first was Bishop as its appearance was said to resemble a bishop's mitre. The US-produced 105 mm Howitzer Motor Carriage M7 was given the service name "Priest" by the British, as part of the superstructure was said to resemble a priest's pulpit. The 1942 self-propelled QF 6 pounder anti-tank gun on wheeled chassis was named "Deacon", and the QF 25-pounder on Ram chassis called "Sexton".

Vehicles in the anti-tank role, excepting Deacon, were given names starting with "A".

=== Production by model ===
- Bishop (150) – expedient conversions of Valentine tank chassis to use 25 pdr, as "Ordnance QF 25-pdr on Carrier Valentine 25-pdr Mk 1"
- 25pdr, SP, Tracked, Sexton (1500+) – built in Canada on a custom derivative of Canadian Ram and later Grizzly tank chassis' using 25 pdr
- Deacon (175) – 6pdr on armoured AEC Matador (wheeled) truck chassis.
- Archer (tank destroyer) (655) – conversions of Valentine tank chassis to use 17 pdr
- 17pdr SP Achilles (1,100) – conversions of US produced M10 Gun Motor Carriage to use 17 pdr in turret
- Avenger (250) – development of the A30 Challenger tank to use 17 pdr in a self-propelled artillery role.
- Alecto – 95 mm howitzer on light tank Mk VIII hull, a few built.

== See also ==
- French armoured fighting vehicle production during World War II
- German armored fighting vehicle production during World War II
- Soviet armored fighting vehicle production during World War II
- American armored fighting vehicle production during World War II
