= United States aircraft production during World War II =

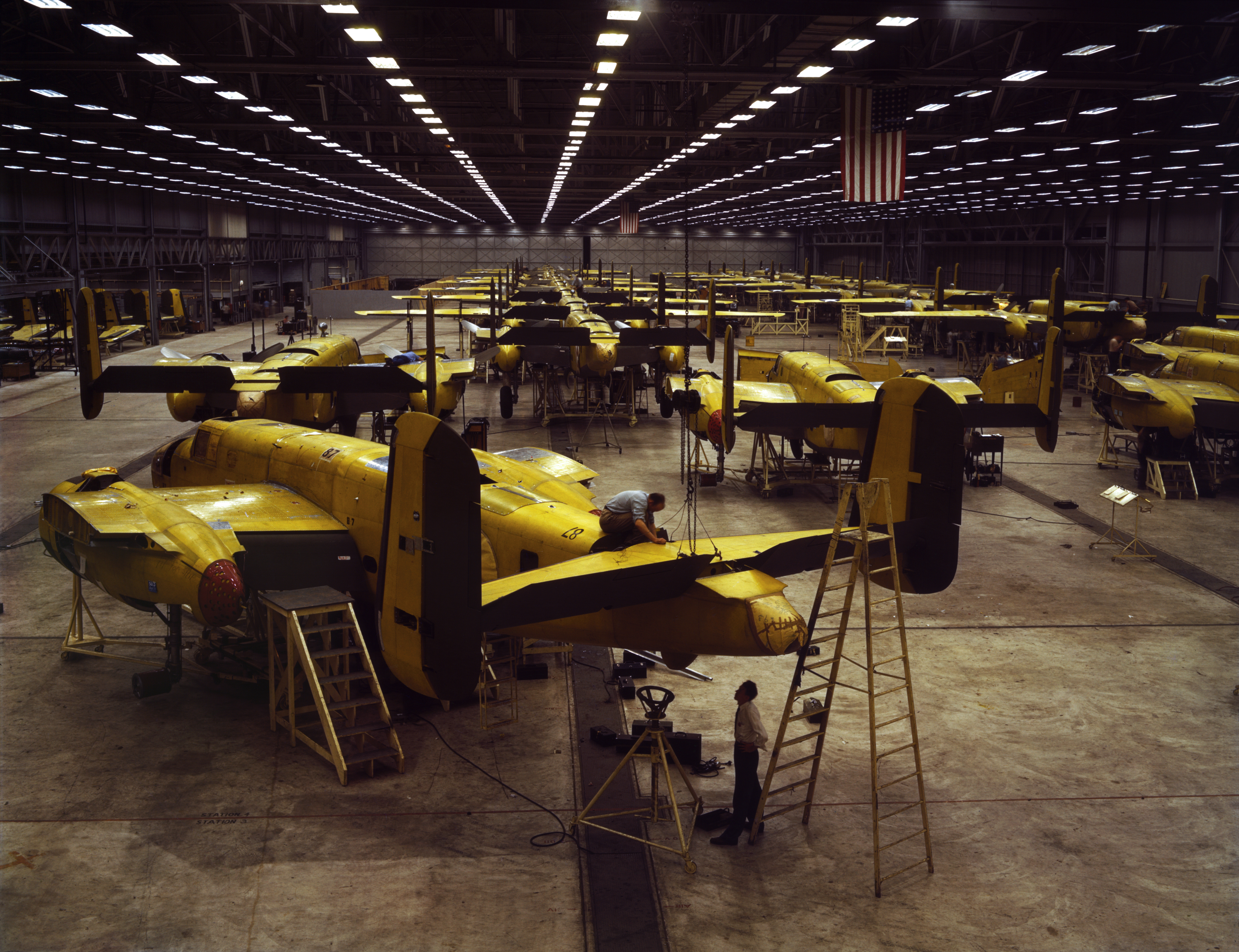
Assembling B-25 Mitchell medium bombers at North American Aviation, Kansas City, October 1942.

America's manufacturers in World War II were engaged in the greatest military industrial effort in history. Aircraft companies went from building a handful of planes at a time to building them by the thousands on assembly lines. Aircraft manufacturing went from a distant 41st place among American industries to first place in less than five years.

In 1939, total aircraft production for the US military was less than 3,000 planes. By the end of the war, America produced 300,000 planes. The Second World War was, up to that point, by far the most industrial war the world had ever seen.

In January 1939, President Franklin D. Roosevelt appealed to Congress for $300 million to be spent on procuring aircraft for the Army Air Corps. At the time the Corps had approximately 1,700 aircraft in total. Congress responded and authorized the procurement of 3,251 aircraft.

The American aircraft industry was given impetus at the early part of the war by the demand from the British and French for aircraft to supplement their own domestic production. The 1939 Neutrality Act permitted belligerents to acquire armaments from US manufacturers provided they paid in cash and used their own transportation - "cash and carry". The British Purchasing Commission had been set up prior to the war to arrange purchase of aircraft and the British and French dealt directly with manufacturers paying from their financial reserves. After France fell to Germany, many of the orders for aircraft were taken over by the British. By 1940, the British had ordered $1,200,000,000 worth of aircraft. This led to some aircraft, such as the North American P-51 Mustang, being designed and produced to meet European requirements and then being adopted by the US. In their need for aircraft the Anglo-French commission also ordered designs from manufacturers that had failed to win US Army contracts - e.g. the Martin Model 167.

The American aircraft industry was able to adapt to the demands of war. In 1939 contracts assumed single-shift production, but as the number of trained workers increased, the factories moved to first two- and then a three-shift schedules. The government aided development of capacity and skills by placing "Educational orders" with manufacturers, and new government-built plants for the private firms to use.

Aircraft companies built other manufacturer's designs; the B-17 Flying Fortress was built by Boeing (the designer), the Lockheed Corporation, and Douglas Aircraft. Automotive companies joined schemes to produce aircraft components and also complete aircraft. Ford set up the Willow Run production facility and built complete Consolidated B-24 Liberators as well as sections to be assembled at other plants.

== Total production ==
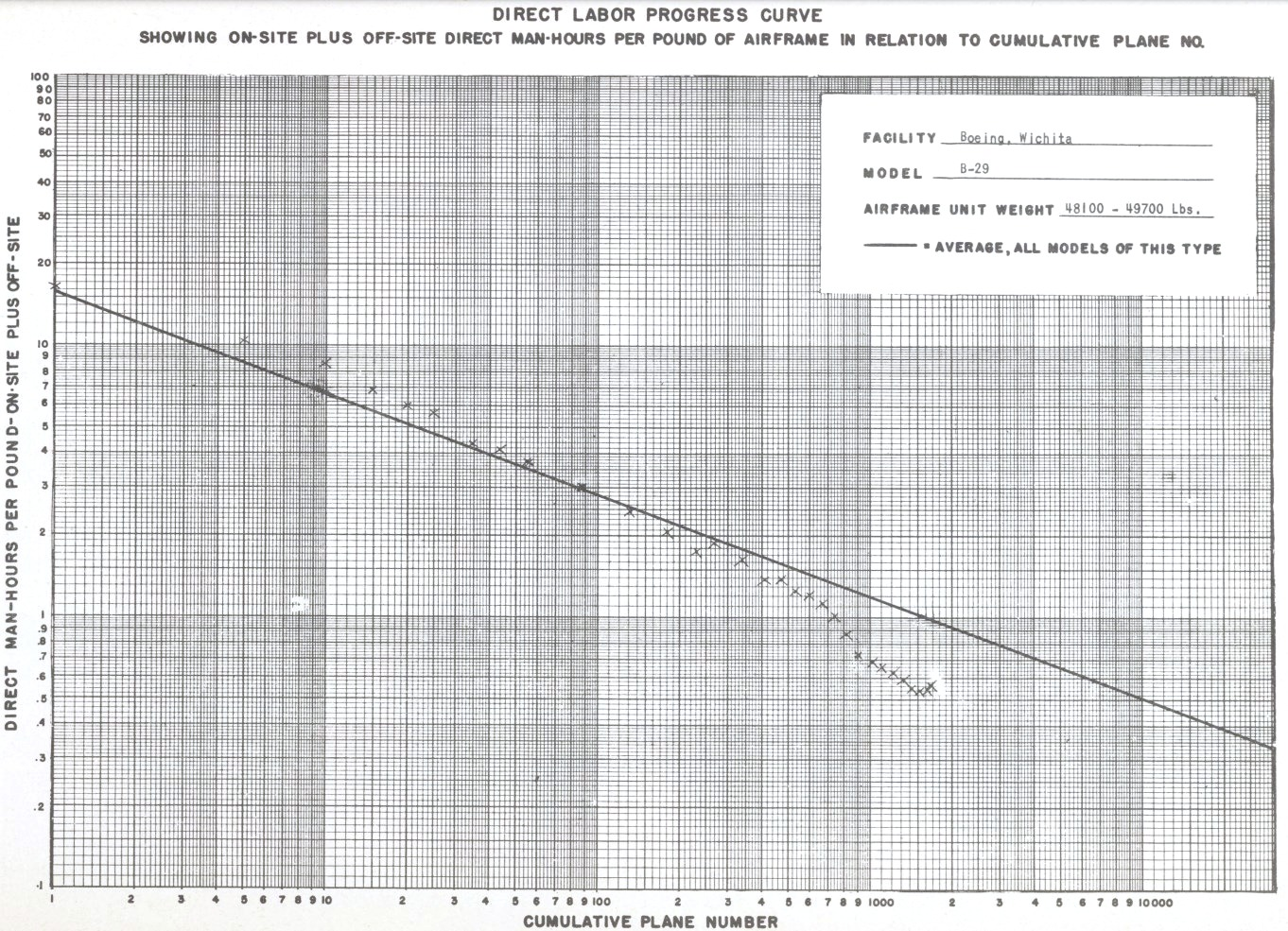
Learning curve of the production of B-29 airframes at the Boeing Wichita division during WWII.

Production
Type of aircraft	Total	1940¹	1941	1942	1943	1944	1945²
Grand total	295,959	3,611	18,466	46,907	84,853	96,270	45,852
Combat aircraft	200,443	1,771	8,395	24,669	53,183	74,564	37,861
Very heavy bombers	3,740	—	—	4	91	1,147	2,498
Heavy bombers	31,685	46	282	2,513	9,574	15,057	4,213
Medium bombers	21,461	52	762	4,040	7,256	6,732	2,619
Light bombers	39,986	453	2,617	5,954	11,848	12,376	6,738
Fighters	99,465	1,157	4,036	10,721	23,621	38,848	21,082
Reconnaissance	4,106	63	698	1,437	793	404	711
Support aircraft	95,516	1,840	10,071	22,238	31,670	21,706	7,991
Transports	23,900	164	525	1,887	6,913	9,925	4,486
Trainers	58,085	1,676	9,294	17,237	20,950	7,936	1,352
Communication	13,531	—	252	3,114	4,167	3,845	2,153

¹July–December ²January–August

== Recipients of U.S. aircraft production ==
Type of airplane	Total	US Army Air Forces	US Navy and US Marine Corps	Other US Services	British Empire and Commonwealth	Soviet Union	Other nations
Grand total	295,959	158,880	73,711	3,714	38,811	14,717	6,126
Combat aircraft	200,443	99,487	56,695	8	27,152	13,929	3,172
Very heavy bombers	3,740	3,740	—	—	—	—	—
Heavy bombers	31,685	27,867	1,683	—	2,135	—	—
Medium bombers	21,461	11,835	4,693	8	3,247	1,010	638
Light bombers	39,986	7,779	20,703	—	8,003	3,021	480
Fighters	99,465	47,050	27,163	—	13,417	9,868	1,967
Reconnaissance	4,106	1,216	2,453	—	350	30	57
Support aircraft	95,516	59,939	17,016	3,706	11,659	788	2,954
Transports	23,900	15,769	2,702	267	3,789	703	670
Trainers	58,085	34,469	13,859	3	7,640	85	2,029
Communication	13,531	9,155	455	3,436	230	—	255

== Analysis ==
William S. Knudsen, an automotive industry executive who was made Chairman of the Office of Production Management and member of the National Defense Advisory Commission by the Roosevelt administration to organize war production, said, "We won because we smothered the enemy in an avalanche of production, the like of which he had never seen, nor dreamed possible."

== See also ==
- Air warfare of World War II
- World War II aircraft production
- American armored fighting vehicle production during World War II

== Sources ==
- Parker, Dana T. (2013). Building Victory: Aircraft Manufacturing in the Los Angeles Area in World War II. Cypress, CA. ISBN 978-0-9897906-0-4.
- AAF Digest Table 79 Army Air Forces Statistical Digest, World War II www.usaaf.net
