= List of aircraft (Mb–Mi) =

This is a list of aircraft in numerical order of manufacturer followed by alphabetical order beginning with 'Mb–Mi'.

== Mb–Mi ==
=== MBB ===
(Messerschmitt-Bölkow-Blohm)

- MBB 223 Flamingo
- MBB Lampyridae
- MBB Bö 102
- MBB Bö 103
- MBB Bö 105
- MBB Bö 106
- MBB Bö 107
- MBB Bö 108
- MBB Bö 115
- MBB Bö 208 Junior
- MBB Bö 209 Monsun
- MBB HFB 320 Hansa-Jet
- MBB Fan Ranger
- MBB/Kawasaki BK 117
- MBB-Kawasaki CH-143
- MBB MHK-101

=== McBride ===
(Kenneth O McBride, 408 W Sea Ave, Independence, MO)

- McBride M.1 Monoplane

=== McCain ===
(William A.McCain)

- McCain Swick-T

=== McCarley ===
(Charles E McCarley, Hueytown, AL)

- McCarley Mini-Mac

=== McCarroll ===
(Cadillac Aircraft Corp (consortium of Detroit businessmen; Pres: Inglis M. Uppercu, vp: H G McCarroll), Detroit, MI)

- McCarroll Duoplane
- McCarroll MAC-1

=== MCC Aviation ===
(Gandvaux, Switzerland)

- MCC Amaya
- MCC Arolla
- MCC Beluga
- MCC Boléa
- MCC Insigia
- MCC Maluga
- MCC Orbea

=== McCarter ===
(Edgar H McCarter, Union City, IN)

- McCarter S-A

=== McCarthy ===
( (George L) McCarthy Aeronautical Engr Co, Lowell, MI)

- McCarthy Air Scout

=== McClary ===
(Earl E McClary (also seen spelled McCleary), South Gate, CA)

- McClary A
- McClary B
- McClary D
- McClary D-1

=== McCook ===
(McCook Aircraft Corp, McCook, NE)

- McCook Commercial

=== McCormick-James ===
((Harold F) McCormick-(Sidney) James, Cicero, IL)

- McCormick-James 1910 Monoplane

=== McCormick-Romme ===
((Harold F) McCormick-(William S) Romme, Cicero, IL)

- McCormick-Romme Umbrellaplane (several iterations)

=== McCulloch ===
(McCulloch Aircraft Corp, 119 Standard St, El Segundo, CA)

- McCulloch J-2
- McCulloch 4E
- McCulloch MC-4
- McCulloch YH-30
- McCulloch XHUM-1

=== McCune ===
(Elliott R McCune, Wallingford, CT)

- McCune Sport

=== McCurdy-Willard ===
((John A D) McCurdy & (Charles F) Willard Aeroplane Co, Nassau Blvd Aerodrome, Long Island, NY, aircraft built by Queen Aeroplane Co, Bronx Park, NY)

- McCurdy-Willard Headless

=== McDaneld ===
(D E McDaneld & Lloyd Royer, Arcadia, CA)

- McDaneld Roamair

=== McDaniel ===
(Alden W McDaniel, Chevy Chase, MD)

- McDaniel 1930 Monoplane

=== McDaniel ===
(Arthur McDaniels, Toledo, OH)

- McDaniels Model 2

=== McDonnell ===
(McDonnell Aircraft Corporation, St. Louis, MO)

- McDonnell Model 2A XP-67
- McDonnell Model 11 FD Phantom
- McDonnell Model 23 FH Phantom
- McDonnell Model 24 F2H Banshee
- McDonnell Model 27E XF-85 Goblin
- McDonnell Model 36 XF-88 Voodoo
- McDonnell Model 36W F-101 Voodoo
- McDonnell Model 37 XHJH Whirlaway
- McDonnell Model 38 XH-20
- McDonnell Model 58 F3H Demon
- McDonnell Model 60 delta-wing alternative to Model 58
- McDonnell Model 61 projected civil variant of XHJH
- McDonnell Model 78 XHRH-1
- McDonnell Model 79 XH-39 Big Henry
- McDonnell Model 82 XV-1
- McDonnell Model 85 RIM-8 Talos SAM missile airframe
- McDonnell Model 86 XHCH-1
- McDonnell Model 90 proposed fighter for OS-130 requirement
- McDonnell Model 91 proposed fighter for OS-130 requirement
- McDonnell Model 92 bomber launched air-to-air missile
- McDonnell Model 96 disposable weapons/fuel pod developed for F-101
- McDonnell Model 98 F-4 Phantom II
- McDonnell Model 99 Convertiplane for USAF, development of Model 78 and forerunner of Model 113
- McDonnell Model 100 fighter launched air-to-air missile, based on Model 92
- McDonnell Model 113 large military transport convertiplane project
- McDonnell Model 119 planned four-engine business jet; later known as Model 220
- McDonnell Model 120 flying crane helicopter derived from the XV-1
- McDonnell Model 188 planned licensed production of the Bruguet 941
- McDonnell Model 192 Project Isinglass
- McDonnell F-2 Banshee
- McDonnell F-3 Demon
- McDonnell F-4 Phantom II
- McDonnell F-101 Voodoo
- McDonnell F-110 Spectre
- McDonnell XF-85 Goblin
- McDonnell F-88 Voodoo
- McDonnell AH
- McDonnell FD Phantom
- McDonnell FH Phantom
- McDonnell F2H Banshee
- McDonnell F3H Demon
- McDonnell F4H Phantom II
- McDonnell H-20 Little Henry
- McDonnell H-29
- McDonnell HCH (not built)
- McDonnell HJD Whirlaway
- McDonnell HJH Whirlaway
- McDonnell KDD Kadydid
- McDonnell TD2D Katydid
- McDonnell KSD Gargoyle
- McDonnell LBD Gargoyle
- McDonnell L-25
- McDonnell LBD Gargoyle
- McDonnell P-67 Bat
- McDonnell V-1 Jeep
- McDonnell CF-101 Voodoo – Canadian Armed Forces
- McDonnell Doodlebug

=== McDonnell Douglas ===
- McDonnell Douglas Project Kahu
- McDonnell Douglas High Alpha Research Vehicle
- McDonnell Douglas A-4 Skyhawk
- McDonnell Douglas A-4G Skyhawk
- McDonnell Douglas A-4K Skyhawk
- McDonnell Douglas/Lockheed-Martin A-4AR Fightinghawk
- McDonnell Douglas/General Dynamics A-12 Avenger
- McDonnell Douglas A-12 Avenger II
- McDonnell Douglas AV-8B Harrier II
- McDonnell Douglas C-9 Nightingale
- McDonnell Douglas C-9 Skytrain II
- McDonnell Douglas/Boeing C-17 Globemaster III
- McDonnell Douglas KC-10 Extender
- McDonnell Douglas YC-15
- McDonnell Douglas AH-64 Apache
- McDonnell Douglas F-4 Phantom II
- McDonnell Douglas F-15 Eagle
- McDonnell Douglas F-15 STOL/MTD
- McDonnell Douglas F-15E Strike Eagle
- McDonnell Douglas F/A-18 Hornet
- McDonnell Douglas/British Aerospace AV-8B Harrier II
- McDonnell Douglas KC-10 Extender
- McDonnell Douglas T-45 Goshawk
- McDonnell Douglas X-36
- McDonnell Douglas DC-8
- McDonnell Douglas DC-9
- McDonnell Douglas DC-9 Super 80
- McDonnell Douglas DC-10
- McDonnell Douglas DC-10 Air Tanker
- McDonnell Douglas MD-10
- McDonnell Douglas MD-11
- McDonnell Douglas MD-12
- McDonnell Douglas MD-80
- McDonnell Douglas MD-81
- McDonnell Douglas MD-82
- McDonnell Douglas MD-83
- McDonnell Douglas MD-87
- McDonnell Douglas MD-88
- McDonnell Douglas MD-90
- McDonnell Douglas MD-94X
- McDonnell Douglas MD-95
- McDonnell Douglas CF-188 Hornet Canadian Armed Forces
- F/A-18E/F Super Hornet

=== McGaffey ===
((Neill F) McGaffey Airplane Development Co, Inglewood, CA)

- McGaffey Aviate

=== McGill ===
(Robert G McGill Aircraft Co, 661 Turk St, San Francisco, CA)

- McGill S

=== McGregor ===
(Wilmer McGregor, Hamilton, Ontario, Canada)

- McGregor MG-65

=== McGuiness ===
(Pete McGuiness)

- McGuiness Windsong

=== McKellar ===
(John D McKellar, California Polytechnic College, San Luis Obispo, CA)

- McKellar M-1

=== McKenzie ===
(George Mckenzie)

- McKenzie Silver Wings

=== McKinnie ===
(McKinnie Aircraft Co Ltd)

- McKinnie 165

=== McKinnon ===
(McKinnon Enterprises Inc)

- McKinnon G-21C
- McKinnon G-21D
- McKinnon G-21E
- McKinnon G-21F
- McKinnon G-21G Turbo Goose
- McKinnon Super Widgeon
- McKinnon Turbo-Goose

=== McKissick ===
()

- McKissick Viceroy

=== McLaughlin ===
(M L McLaughlin, Iowa City, IA)

- McLaughlin Model A Skybuggy

=== McMahon ===
(John F McMahon, New York, NY)

- McMahon Model T

=== McMechan ===
(Maurice H McMechan, 110 N 5 Ave, Yakima, WA)

- McMechan AC-2
- McMechan 1936 aeroplane

=== McMullen ===
((A B) McMullen Aircraft Corp/Aviation School, Tampa, FL)

- McMullen Mac Airliner
- McMullen MC-1
- McMullen MC-2

=== McNeal ===
(Francis B McNeal, Hartington, NE)

- McNeal 21

=== McPherson ===
(John Bayard McPherson IV, Old Welsh Rd, Abington, PA)

- McPherson Model 1

=== McRae ===
(Walter C McRae, Grove City, MN)

- McRae 1927 Monoplane

=== McVean ===
(O & W McVean Ltd)

- McVean Valkyr V-2

=== McWethy ===
(Walter C McRae, Grove City, MN)

- McWethy A-2

=== MD Helicopters ===
- MD 500C (369H)
- MD 500M Defender (369HM)
- MD 500C (369HS)
- MD 500C (369HE)
- MD 500D (369D)
- MD 500E (369E)
- KH-500E
- NH-500E
- MD 520N
- MD 530F (369F)
- MD 600
- MD 600N
- MD Explorer
- MD 900 Explorer
- MD 901 Explorer
- MD 902
- MH-90 Enforcer
- MD Combat Explorer

=== MDG ===
(Matériel-Denis-Gruson / Louis Delasalle)

- MDG LD.26 Midgy-Club
- MDG LD.261 Midgy-Club
- MDG LD.45

=== Mead ===
(Mead Engineering Co, Colwich, KS)

- Mead Adventure 100

=== Meade ===
(C R Meade, Blackwell, OK)

- Meade Swallow

=== Meadowbrook ===
(William Meadowbrook (possibly Meadowcroft))

- Meadowbrook MC-1 Chinook

=== Meadowlark Ultralight ===
(Meadowlark Ultralight Corporation)

- Meadowlark Ultralight Meadowlark

=== Means ===
(Sidney S Means, San Antonio, TX)

- Means Taper wing

=== Meckler-Allen ===
(Allen Canton and John J. Meckler)

- Meckler-Allen 1912 Biplane

=== Medway ===
(Medway Microlights, Rochester, Kent, United Kingdom)

- Medway Av8R
- Medway EclipseR
- Medway SLA100 Executive
- Medway SLA100 Clipper

=== Medwecki ===
(Józef Medwecki and Zygmund Nowakowski)

- Medwecki M9
- Medwecki HL 2
- Medwecki and Nowakowski M.N.5

=== Meger ===
(Mike Meger, Marinette, WI)

- Meger Heli-Star

=== Meggitt ===
- Meggitt Banshee

=== Mehr ===
(Ing. Franz Xaver Mehr – Erla Maschinenwerk G.m.b.H.)

- Mehr Me 1 – ultralight 12 hp DKW TL500
- Mehr Me 2 – not built due to lack of funds
- Mehr Me 3 1931
- Mehr Me 4 glider
- Mehr Me 4a motor-glider
- Mehr Me 5
- Mehr Me 6

=== Meindl/van Nes ===
(Ob.-Ing. Erich Meindl / Wilhelm van Nes)

- Meindl/van Nes A.VII Cadet (Meindl M7)
- Meindl/van Nes A.VIII (Meindl M8)
- Meindl/van Nes A.XV (Meindl M15)

=== Meindl ===
(Ob.-Ing. Erich Meindl / Burgfalke Flugzeugbau)

- Meindl M.15
- Meindl M.100
- Meindl M.101
- Meindl M.110
- Burgfalke M.150 Schulmeister
- Meindl M.211

=== Melberg-Greenemeier ===
((Raymond) Melberg, (Conrad) Greenemeier & (Rowan) Ward, 2949 Columbia St, Denver CO) a.k.a. Melberg-Greenemeier-Ward

- Melberg-Greenemeier MG-1
- Melberg-Greenemeier MG-2 a.k.a. DGA Wilson or Humphreys MG-2
- Melberg-Greenemeier MG-3

=== Melbourne Aircraft Corporation ===
- MAC Mamba

=== Melfe ===
(Mike Melfa, Miami, FL)

- Melfa WCA-1

=== Melody Aircraft ===
(Melody Aircraft Ltd.)

- Melody Aircraft Song
- BELITE ULTRACUB
- BELITE PROCUB

=== Melton ===
(Clarence C Melton, Kansas City, MO)

- Melton#1 (Katydid)
- Melton#3 (Sport)
- Melton Houpisine a.k.a. K C Special

=== Mendenhall ===
(Eugene Mendenhall, Los Angeles, CA)

- Mendenhall M-1 a.k.a. Special

=== Menefee ===
(Menefee Airways Inc, 2111 Burgundy St, New Orleans, LA)

- Menefee Crescent

=== Mentzel ===
(Ing Büro Mentzel, Prinzhöfte, Germany)

- Mentzel Baltic Fox
- Mentzel Baltic Fox Sea

=== Merćep ===
(Mihajlo Merćep)

- Merćep 1909 Biplane
- Merćep-Rusjan 1910 monoplane – Slovenia – M.Mercep, E. Rusjan and J. Rusjan
- Merćep 1911 Monoplane
- Merćep 1912 Monoplane

=== Merckle ===
- Merckle SM 67

=== Mercury ===
(1920: Aerial Service Corp (Pres: Henry Kleckler), Hammondsport, NY, 1922: Aerial Engr Corp, 1929: Mercury Aviation Co (Harvey Mummert, R W Schroeder & John R Wentworth). )

- Mercury Chic T-2
- Mercury CW-1 Junior
- Mercury S a.k.a. Red Racer
- Mercury S-1 a.k.a. White Racer
- Mercury Special
- Aerial Booth Bee Line
- Aerial Mercury Senior
- Aerial Standard
- Aerial Thurston Monoplane
- Aerial Kitten
- Aerial DW-4 Trainer
- Aerial Arrow

=== Mercury ===
(Mercury Aircraft Corp (Pres: P E Crosby), Fairfax KS.)

- Mercury Mars

=== Mercury ===
( Mercury Aircraft Corp (Pres: F L Bette, V Pres/chief engr: J B Baumann, V Pres/gen mgr: Dick Smith), Menominee, MI)

- Mercury B-100
- Mercury BT-120 Aerobat

=== Mercury Air ===
- Mercury Air Shoestring

=== Meridionali ===
(IMAM – Industrie Meccaniche e Aeronautiche Meridonali)

- IMAM Ro.1
- IMAM Ro.5
- IMAM Ro.10
- IMAM Ro.26
- IMAM Ro.30
- IMAM Ro.35
- IMAM Ro.37
- IMAM Ro.41
- IMAM Ro.43
- IMAM Ro.44
- IMAM Ro.45
- IMAM Ro.51
- IMAM Ro.57
- IMAM Ro.58
- IMAM Ro.63
- IMAM Ro.71
- IMAM AG
- Meridionali/Agusta EMA 124

=== Merkel ===
( (Edwin W) Merkel Airplane Co, Wichita and Valley Center, KS)

- Merkel Mark II

=== Merckle ===
(Merckle Flugzeugbau)

- Merkle LF 501 Kiebitz

=== Merle ===
(A J Merle, Alameda, CA, and Hans P Nielsen, Alameda, CA)

- Merle 1910 Biplane

=== Merlin ===
- Merlin EZ
- Merlin GT

=== Merlin ===
(Merlin Autogyros, Quedgeley, Gloucestershire, United Kingdom)

- Merlin GTS

=== Merrill ===
((Albert A) Merrill Aircraft Co. / California Institute of Technology)

- Merrill CIT-9 Safety Plane

=== Merrill ===
(Herbert J Merrill, San Diego, CA)

- Merrill 1931 Monoplane

=== Merville ===
(Société des Hélices G. Merville)

- Merville D.63
- Merville SM.30
- Merville SM.31

=== Messer ===
((Glenn) Messer Aeronautical Industries Inc. / Southern Aircraft Co.)

- Messer 1927 Biplane

=== Messerschmitt ===
(Messerschmitt AG)

- Messerschmitt M 17
- Messerschmitt M 35
- Messerschmitt M 36
- Messerschmitt Bf 108 Taifun
- Messerschmitt Bf 109
- Messerschmitt Bf 110
- Messerschmitt Me 155
- Messerschmitt Bf 161
- Messerschmitt Bf 162 Jaguar
- Messerschmitt Me 163 Komet
- Messerschmitt Bf 164
- Messerschmitt Me 208
- Messerschmitt Me 209 racer
- Messerschmitt Me 209 fighter
- Messerschmitt Me 210
- Messerschmitt Me 261
- Messerschmitt Me 262 Schwalbe
- Messerschmitt Me 263
- Messerschmitt Me 264 Amerika
- Messerschmitt Me 265
- Messerschmitt Me 309
- Messerschmitt Me 310
- Messerschmitt Me 321 Gigant
- Messerschmitt Me 323 Gigant
- Messerschmitt Me 328
- Messerschmitt Me 329
- Messerschmitt Me 410 Hornisse
- Messerschmitt Me 509
- Messerschmitt Me 609
- Messerschmitt C-44

=== Messier ===
( Avion George Messier – now Messier-Bugatti-Dowty)

- Messier CT.001

=== Messler ===
(Raoul Messier, Andover, CT)

- Messler Snipe PT101 Serial 2

=== Metal Aircraft Corporation ===
- Metal Aircraft Corporation Flamingo
- Metal Aircraft Corp G-1 Flamingo
- Metal Aircraft Corp G-2 Flamingo
- Metal Aircraft Corp G-2 Flamingo
- Metal Aircraft Corp G-2-W Flamingo
- Metal Aircraft Corp G-MT-6 Flamingo

=== Metal Master ===
- Metal Master LAR-1

=== Métalair ===
- Métalair 1

=== Metalclad ===
- Metalclad Airship

=== Metcalf ===
- Metcalf 1909 Helicopter

=== Meteor ===
- Meteor FL.53
- Meteor FL.54
- Meteor FL.55
- Meteor bis
- Meteor Super

=== Meteoric ===
(Meteoric Aeroplane Co)

- Meteoric 1911 Aeroplane

=== Methvin ===
(Wilbur C Methvin, Lawrenceburg, TN & Kermit Parker, Atlanta, GA)

- Methvin XP-101

=== Meunier ===
(Pierre Meunier)

- Meunier PM.301 Dauphin

=== Meyer ===
(George W Meyer, Corpus Christi, TX)

- Meyer Little Toot

=== Meyer ===
(Les K Meyer, Enumclaw, WA)

- K-Meyer Aero Model A

=== Meyer ===
(Clair O Meyer, Bay Minette, AL)

- Meyer P-51B (2/3 scale)

=== Meyerhoffer ===
(Otto Meyerhoffer, Oroville)

- Otto Meyerhoffer, Oroville, CA

=== Meyers ===
(George F Meyes, Columbus, OH)

- Meyers 1906 Orthopter

=== Meyers ===
(Charles W Meyers, Greensboro, NC)

- Meyers Midget

=== Meyers ===
((Allen H) Meyers Aircraft Co, Romulus and Tecumseh, MI)

- Meyers OTW-125
- Meyers OTW-145
- Meyers OTW-160
- Meyers MAC-124
- Meyers MAC 125
- Meyers MAC-126
- Meyers MAC-145
- Meyers MAC-200
- Meyers Me-165W
- Meyers 200

=== MFI ===
(Malmö FlygIndustri)

- MFI-9 Junior
- MFI-10 Vipan
- MFI BA-12 Sländan
- MFI-15

=== MFP ===
(M F P Steel Constructed Aeroplanes, New York, NY)

- MFP 1916 Biplane

=== MGH ===
(MGH (William Monahan, Henry W Gastman, Behrend H Hallen), Newcastle, CA)

- MGH LM-1

=== MIAG-Dietrich ===
- MIAG-Dietrich MD 12

=== Miami Maid ===
(Miami Aircraft Corp (Pres: Joseph M Smoot), Miami, FL)

- Miami Maid Amphibian MM-200?
- Miami Maid MM-201 Flying Boat

=== Miazga ===
(Michael Miazga, Glenville, CT)

- Miazga B-185

=== Micco ===
(Micco Aircraft Co (Fdr: Chief James Billie; Pres: F DeWitt Beckett), Fort Pierce, FL)

- Micco SP20

=== Micro Aviation ===
- Micro Aviation Bat Hawk

=== Michelstadt ===
(Flugzeugbau Michelstadt)

- Michelstadt Maikäfer (DFS)

=== Michigan ===
(Michigan Aircraft Co, 13210 French Rd, Detroit, MI)

- Michigan Aircraft 1 a.k.a. Breese-Dallas X
- Michigan TM-5 a.k.a. Breese-Dallas X

=== Micro Aviation ===
(Micro Aviation New Zealand Limited, Hamilton, New Zealand)

- Micro Aviation B22 Bantam

=== Micro-Aviation ===
- Micro-Aviation RG.501 Air Club

=== Microjet ===
(Microjet SA)

- Microjet 200

=== Microleve ===
- Microleve Corsário
- Microleve Echo 2000RG
- Microleve P96 Golf
- Microleve P92 Echo
- Microleve ML 450
- Microleve ML-500 T

=== Microlight Aviation ===
- Microlight Aviation Vampire-MKI
- Microlight Aviation Super Genie

=== Micronautix ===
- Micronautix Triton

=== Midwest ===
(Midwest Engineering & Design) (Shawnee, KS)

- Midwest Hornet
- Midwest Questar Arrowstar
- Midwest Questar Open Aire
- Midwest Questar Sport
- Midwest Questar XLS
- Midwest Zodiac Talon-Turbine

=== Midwest Microlights ===
- Midwest 1
- Midwest 2 Mercury
- Midwest Tomcat

=== Miettaux ===
(Lucien Miettaux)

- Miettaux Ortolan

=== Mignet ===
(Henri Mignet)

- Mignet HM-1-1
- Mignet HM-1-2
- Mignet HM.2
- Mignet HM.3 'The Dromedary'
- Mignet HM.4
- Mignet HM.5 Planeur brouette
- Mignet HM.6
- Mignet HM.7
- Mignet HM.8
- Mignet HM.14
- Mignet HM.16 Pou-Bébé (Baby Pou)
- Mignet HM.18
- Mignet HM.19
- Mignet HM.210
- Mignet HM.280 Pou-Maquis
- Mignet HM.283
- Mignet HM.290
- Mignet HM.293
- Mignet HM.296
- Mignet HM.310 Estafette
- Mignet HM.320
- Mignet HM.330 Cerisier en Fleurs
- Mignet HM.350
- Mignet HM.351
- Mignet HM.360
- Mignet HM.380
- Mignet HM.390
- Mignet HM.1000 Balerit
- Mignet HM.1100 Cordouan

=== Mihail ===
(Filip Mihail)

- Mihail Stabiloplan III
- Mihail Stabiloplan IV

=== Mikoyan ===
- Mikoyan Project 1.44
- Mikoyan MiG-AT
- Mikoyan MiG 18-50
- Mikoyan MiG-110
- Mikoyan MiG SVB

=== Mikoyan-Gurevich ===
- Mikoyan-Gurevich MiG-1
- Mikoyan-Gurevich MiG-2
- Mikoyan-Gurevich MiG-3
- Mikoyan-Gurevich MiG-4
- Mikoyan-Gurevich MiG-5
- Mikoyan-Gurevich MiG-6
- Mikoyan-Gurevich MiG-7
- Mikoyan-Gurevich MiG-8
- Mikoyan-Gurevich MiG-9 (1st use) (MiG-3 M-82A)
- Mikoyan-Gurevich MiG-9
- Mikoyan-Gurevich MiG-11
- Mikoyan-Gurevich MiG-13
- Mikoyan-Gurevich MiG-15
- Mikoyan-Gurevich MiG-17
- Mikoyan-Gurevich MiG-19
- Mikoyan-Gurevich MiG-21
- Mikoyan-Gurevich MiG-23 (1st use) (Ye-2A "Faceplate")
- Mikoyan-Gurevich MiG-23 (2nd use) (Ye-8 and MiG-23M – Ye-8 deriv.)
- Mikoyan-Gurevich MiG-23 (3rd use) ("Flogger")
- Mikoyan-Gurevich MiG-23PD (Izdeliye 23-01 "Faithless")
- Mikoyan-Gurevich MiG-25
- Mikoyan-Gurevich MiG-25 PU Foxbat
- Mikoyan-Gurevich MiG-27
- Mikoyan-Gurevich MiG-29
- Mikoyan-Gurevich MiG-31
- Mikoyan-Gurevich MiG-33
- Mikoyan-Gurevich MiG-35
- Mikoyan-Gurevich A
- Mikoyan-Gurevich 2A
- Mikoyan-Gurevich 3A
- Mikoyan-Gurevich 4A
- Mikoyan-Gurevich 5A
- Mikoyan-Gurevich A-144
- Mikoyan-Gurevich D
- Mikoyan-Gurevich 2D
- Mikoyan-Gurevich DIS
- Mikoyan-Gurevich DIS-200
- Mikoyan-Gurevich F
- Mikoyan-Gurevich FF
- Mikoyan-Gurevich FK
- Mikoyan-Gurevich FL
- Mikoyan-Gurevich FN
- Mikoyan-Gurevich FP
- Mikoyan-Gurevich FR
- Mikoyan-Gurevich FS
- Mikoyan-Gurevich FT
- Mikoyan-Gurevich I-1
- Mikoyan-Gurevich I-2
- Mikoyan-Gurevich I-3
- Mikoyan-Gurevich I-5
- Mikoyan-Gurevich I-7
- Mikoyan-Gurevich I-75
- Mikoyan-Gurevich I-200
- Mikoyan-Gurevich I-210
- Mikoyan-Gurevich I-211
- Mikoyan-Gurevich I-220
- Mikoyan-Gurevich I-221
- Mikoyan-Gurevich I-222
- Mikoyan-Gurevich I-224
- Mikoyan-Gurevich I-225
- Mikoyan-Gurevich I-230
- Mikoyan-Gurevich I-231
- Mikoyan-Gurevich I-240
- Mikoyan-Gurevich I-250
- Mikoyan-Gurevich I-260
- Mikoyan-Gurevich I-270
- Mikoyan-Gurevich I-300
- Mikoyan-Gurevich I-301
- Mikoyan-Gurevich I-302
- Mikoyan-Gurevich I-305
- Mikoyan-Gurevich I-307
- Mikoyan-Gurevich I-308
- Mikoyan-Gurevich I-310
- Mikoyan-Gurevich I-312
- Mikoyan-Gurevich I-320 (MiG-9)
- Mikoyan-Gurevich I-320
- Mikoyan-Gurevich I-330
- Mikoyan-Gurevich I-340
- Mikoyan-Gurevich I-350
- Mikoyan-Gurevich I-360
- Mikoyan-Gurevich I-370
- Mikoyan-Gurevich I-380
- Mikoyan-Gurevich I-410
- Mikoyan-Gurevich I-500
- Mikoyan-Gurevich IP-201
- Mikoyan-Gurevich Izdeliye 23-01 (correct designation for MiG-23PD)
- Mikoyan-Gurevich IKh
- Mikoyan-Gurevich ISh
- Mikoyan-Gurevich IT
- Mikoyan-Gurevich Kh
- Mikoyan-Gurevich KhS
- Mikoyan-Gurevich M
- Mikoyan-Gurevich M-15
- Mikoyan-Gurevich M-17
- Mikoyan-Gurevich M-19
- Mikoyan-Gurevich M-21
- Mikoyan-Gurevich N
- Mikoyan-Gurevich PBSh-1
- Mikoyan-Gurevich PBSh-2
- Mikoyan-Gurevich R
- Mikoyan-Gurevich S
- Mikoyan-Gurevich SA
- Mikoyan-Gurevich Samolyot Ye
- Mikoyan-Gurevich SD
- Mikoyan-Gurevich SDK
- Mikoyan-Gurevich SF
- Mikoyan-Gurevich SG
- Mikoyan-Gurevich SI
- Mikoyan-Gurevich SL
- Mikoyan-Gurevich SM-1
- Mikoyan-Gurevich SM-2
- Mikoyan-Gurevich SM-9
- Mikoyan-Gurevich SMR
- Mikoyan-Gurevich SN
- Mikoyan-Gurevich SO
- Mikoyan-Gurevich SP-1
- Mikoyan-Gurevich SP
- Mikoyan-Gurevich SR
- Mikoyan-Gurevich SSh
- Mikoyan-Gurevich ST
- Mikoyan-Gurevich SU
- Mikoyan-Gurevich SV
- Mikoyan-Gurevich SYa
- Mikoyan-Gurevich SYe
- Mikoyan-Gurevich T
- Mikoyan-Gurevich Ye-1
- Mikoyan-Gurevich Ye-2
- Mikoyan-Gurevich Ye-4
- Mikoyan-Gurevich Ye-5
- Mikoyan-Gurevich Ye-6
- Mikoyan-Gurevich Ye-7
- Mikoyan-Gurevich Ye-8
- Mikoyan-Gurevich Ye-9
- Mikoyan-Gurevich Ye-23DPD
- Mikoyan-Gurevich Ye-23IG
- Mikoyan-Gurevich Ye-26
- Mikoyan-Gurevich Ye-33
- Mikoyan-Gurevich Ye-50
- Mikoyan-Gurevich Ye-66
- Mikoyan-Gurevich Ye-150
- Mikoyan-Gurevich Ye-151
- Mikoyan-Gurevich Ye-152
- Mikoyan-Gurevich Ye-152A
- Mikoyan-Gurevich Ye-152M
- Mikoyan-Gurevich Ye-152P
- Mikoyan-Gurevich Ye-155
- Mikoyan-Gurevich Ye-166
- Mikoyan-Gurevich Ye-266
- Mikoyan-Gurevich Zh
- Mikoyan-Gurevich 1.42
- Mikoyan-Gurevich 1.44

=== Mil ===
- Mil A-10
- Mil Mi-1
- Mil Mi-2
- Mil Mi-3
- Mil Mi-4
- Mil Mi-6
- Mil Mi-8
- Mil Mi-9
- Mil Mi-10
- Mil Mi-14
- Mil Mi-17
- Mil Mi-18
- Mil Mi-24
- Mil Mi-26
- Mil Mi-28
- Mil Mi-30
- Mil Mi-34
- Mil Mi-36
- Mil Mi-38
- Mil Mi-42
- Mil Mi-54
- Mil Mi-58
- Mil Mi-60 MAI
- Mil V-5
- Mil V-7
- Mil V-12
- Mil V-16
- Mil Mi-X1

=== Miles Happy ===
(Miles Happy, 43387 Mannix Road, Newberry Springs, CA)

- Miles Happy Adventurer 2+2

=== Miles ===
(Philips and Powis Aircraft, Miles Aircraft Ltd, FG Miles Ltd)

- Southern Martlet
- Metal Martlet
- Miles M.1 Satyr
- Miles M.2 Hawk
- Miles M.2 Hawk Trainer
- Miles M.2 Hawk Major
- Miles M.3A Falcon Major
- Miles M.3B Falcon Six
- Miles M.4 Merlin
- Miles M.5 Sparrowhawk
- Miles M.6 Hawcon
- Miles M.7 Nighthawk
- Miles M.8 Peregrine
- Miles M.9 Kestrel
- Miles M.9A Master
- Miles M.11 Whitney Straight
- Miles M.11C
- Miles M.12 Mohawk
- Miles M.13 Hobby
- Miles M.14 Magister
- Miles M.14 Hawk Trainer III
- Miles M.15 Trainer
- Miles M.16 Mentor
- Miles M.17 Monarch
- Miles M.18
- Miles M.19 Master II
- Miles M.20
- Miles M.24 Master Fighter
- Miles Martinet
- Miles M.26 'X'
- Miles M.27 Master III
- Miles M.28 Mercury
- Miles M.30 'X Minor'
- Miles M.33 Monitor
- Miles M.35 Libellula
- Miles M.37 Martinet Trainer
- Miles M.38 Messenger
- Miles M.39B Libellula Libellula
- Miles M.50 Queen Martinet
- Miles M.52
- Miles M.57 Aerovan
- Miles M.60 Marathon
- Miles M.64 L.R.5
- Miles M.65 Gemini
- Miles M.68 Boxcar
- Miles M.69 Marathon II
- Miles M.71 Merchantman
- Miles M.75 Aries
- Miles M.76
- Miles M.77 Sparrowjet
- Miles M.100 Student
- Miles M.218
- Miles M.242 taken on by Beagle as the Beagle M.242
- Hurel-Dubois Miles HDM.105, with Societe des Avions Hurel-Dubois

=== Miles & Atwood ===
(Leland Miles & Leon Atwood (built by Larry Brown), Los Angeles, CA)

- Miles & Atwood Special Miss Tulsa

=== Milford ===
(Dale Milford, TX)

- Milford Buckaroo

=== Milholland ===
- Milholland Legal Eagle

=== Military Aircraft ===
(Miller Aviation Corporation)

- Military Aircraft HM-1

=== Militi ===
Bruno Militi()

- Militi M.B.1
- Militi M.B.2 Leonardo
- Militi MB.3 Leonardo
- Militi MB.4

=== Militky-Brditschka ===
(Fred Militky / H.W. Brditschka OHG)

- Militky-Brditschka MB-E1

=== Mill Basin ===
(Mill Basin Aircraft Corp, Brooklyn, NY)

- Mill Basin Aircraft Super Gull W-1

=== Millennium Aircraft ===
(Compact Compositi srl)

- Millennium Master

=== Millennium Helicopter ===
(United States)

- Millennium MH-1

=== Miller ===
(Aeroneering Inc, Savannah, GA)

- Miller Lil' Rascal
- Miller Red Bare-un

=== Miller ===
(Lestere Miller, Dallas, TX)

- Miller 1910 Biplane

=== Miller ===
(Dewey F Miller, Denver, CO)

- Miller 1926 Biplane

=== Miller ===
(Eugene M Miller, Longmont, CO)

- Miller M-1

=== Miller ===
(Henry Miller, Farmington, MI)

- Miller Special

=== Miller ===
(W F Miller, Oneida, NY)

- Miller 1928 Monoplane
- Miller Sport

=== Miller ===
(E Miller, Genesee, ID)

- Miller B

=== Miller ===
(Horrie Miller, Melbourne, Australia)

- Miller biplane

=== Miller ===
(John Miller Corp, New Brunswick, NJ)

- Miller MC-A1

=== Miller ===
(R F Miller, 611 Sampson St, Houston, TX)

- Miller 1930 Biplane

=== Miller ===
(Lewis Miller, Bourbon, IN)

- Miller Model V

=== Miller ===
(Erven A Miller, Milwaukee, WI)

- Miller 1938 Monoplane
- Miller 2
- Miller M-5 Belly Flopper
- Miller M-6 Twin

=== Miller ===
( (Howell W) Miller Aviation Corp, Springfield, MA)

- Miller HM-1 a.k.a. Hawks HM-1
- Miller HM-2
- Miller HM-3
- Miller HM-4 Aerovel a.k.a. Moonship
- Miller HM-5
- Miller Z-1
- Miller Z-2
- Miller Z-3 Zeta
- Miller MAC-1

=== Miller ===
(James W Miller, Springfield, MA)

- Miller GEM-260
- Miller Jet Profile Twin Comanche 200
- Miller JM-1 Ole Tiger Texas Gem
- Miller JM-2
- Miller Special

=== Miller ===
(Paul K Miller, Los Angeles, CA)

- Miller M-1

=== Miller ===
(International Aircraft Mfg Inc (Inter-Air))

- Miller 260A

=== Miller ===
(Ray Miller, Tulsa, OK)

- Miller Special a.k.a. Fly Rod

=== Miller ===
(William Y Miller, Mesa, AZ)

- Miller WM-2 a.k.a. Sport Plane

=== Miller ===
(Paul K Miller, Los Angeles, CA)

- Miller M-1

=== Miller-Bohannon ===
(Jim W Miller and Bruce Bohannon)

- Miller-Bohannon JM-2 Pushy Galore

=== Miller-Brown ===
(Roy G. Miller and D. T. Brown / Naval Aircraft Factory, Navy Yard, Philadelphia, PA)

- Miller-Brown Turkey Buzzard

=== Miller-Ybarra ===
(Guy Miller & Guy Ybarra, Pittsburgh, PA)

- Miller-Ybarra Model 1

=== Millet-Lagarde ===
- Millet Lagarde ML-10

=== Millicer ===
- Millicer M10 AirTourer

=== Milliken ===
(William Milliken Jr, Old Town, ME)

- Milliken M-1

=== Mills ===
(Frank Mills, South Beach, Staten Island, NY)

- Mills 1915 Biplane

=== Milon ===
(Pierre Milon / Aéro-club de Brive)

- Milon-Brive PMB.78 le Faucon

=== Minié ===
(Société Minié Aéronautiques)

- Minié Emouchet Escopette

=== Minié ===
(Société d'Études Victor Minié Aéronautiques) See: SEVIMIA

=== Mini-Fly GmbH ===
(Kirchardt, Germany)

- Mini-Fly Set

=== Minges ===
(Richard Minges)

- Minges M-30 Special

=== Minina ===
(Gérard Minina)

- Minina MG.2 Harmattan
- Minina MG.3 Harmattan

=== Mini-Hawk ===
(Mini-Hawk Intl (Thomas E Maloney, William B Taylor, E Y Treffinger), Santa Monica, CA)

- Mini-Hawk I
- Mini-Hawk Tiger-Hawk

=== Minty ===
(E.R. Minty)

- Minty Skyhook Mini Chopper

=== MIP ===
(Gustaw Mokrzycki, Ludwig Moczarski, Jan Idzkowski & Jerzy Ploszajski / Warsaw Technical High School)

- MIP Smyk

=== Mira ===
(Virgilio Mira)

- Mira Golondrina I
- Mira Golondrina II
- Mira Golondrina III
- Mira Golondrina IV

=== Mirage ===
(Mirage Aircraft Corporation (Pres: Larry Burton), Prescott Valley, AZ)

- Mirage Celerity
- Mirage Marathon

=== Mirouze ===
(Alain Mirouze)

- Mirouze AM.1 Pulsar

=== von Mises ===
- Mises R.I

=== Mississippi State University ===
- Mississippi AZ-1 Marvelette
- Mississippi V-11 Marvel
- Mississippi MA-18B Marvelette
- MSU-Honda MH-01
- MSU-Honda MH-02

=== MIT ===
(Massachusetts Institute of Technology, Cambridge, MA, Aeronautics and Astronautics Department)

- MIT Daedalus (Human powered aircraft)
- MIT Light Eagle
- MIT Daedalus 87
- MIT Daedalus 88
- MIT Monarch
- MIT Monarch-B
- MIT Chrysalis

=== Mitchell ===
(Mitchell Aircraft Corp, Porterville, CA)

- Mitchell Wing A-10
- Mitchell Wing B-10
- Mitchell U-2 Superwing
- Mitchell Wing P-38

=== Mitchell ===
(Grover Mitchell, Manchester, CT)

- Mitchell Kitalina

=== Mitrović ===
(Milenko Mitrović-Spirta)

- Mitrović MMS-3

=== Mitsubishi ===
(Mitsubishi Kokuki KK – Mitsubishi Aircraft Corporation) (Mitsubishi Shokai (三菱商会))

- CRJ Series Aircraft (following the acquisition of the program from Bombardier in 2020)
  - CRJ200
  - CRJ700
  - CRJ900
  - CRJ1000
- Mitsubishi 1MF1
- Mitsubishi 1MF1A
- Mitsubishi 1MF2
- Mitsubishi 1MF3
- Mitsubishi 1MF4
- Mitsubishi 1MF5A
- Mitsubishi 1MF9
- Mitsubishi 1MF10
- Mitsubishi 1MT
- Mitsubishi 2MB1
- Mitsubishi 2MB2
- Mitsubishi 2MR
- Mitsubishi 2MR7
- Mitsubishi 2MR8
- Mitsubishi 2MRT
- Mitsubishi 2MR5
- Mitsubishi 2MS1
- Mitsubishi 2MT
- Mitsubishi 3MT
- Mitsubishi 3MT5
- Mitsubishi 3MT10
- Mitsubishi 4MS1
- Mitsubishi-Hanriot 28 Trainer
- Mitsubishi Igo-1-A
- Mitsubishi R-1.2 Trainer
- Mitsubishi R-2.2 Trainer
- Mitsubishi R-4 Survey Aircraft
- Mitsubishi F3B1 Trainer
- Mitsubishi Tora Long-range Aircraft
- Mitsubishi T-1.2 Converted Aeroplane
- Mitsubishi Hibari Trainer
- Mitsubishi Tombo Trainer
- Mitsubishi Ka-8
- Mitsubishi Ka-9
- Mitsubishi Ka-12
- Mitsubishi Ka-14
- Mitsubishi ATD-X
- Mitsubishi F-1
- Mitsubishi F-2
- Mitsubishi F-3
- Mitsubishi X-2 Shinshin
- Mitsubishi H-60
- Mitsubishi MC-1
- Mitsubishi MC-20
- Mitsubishi MH2000
- Mitsubishi MS-1
- Mitsubishi Hato Survey Aircraft
- Mitsubishi Hinazuru Passenger Transport
- Mitsubishi Ohtori
- Mitsubishi Regional Jet
- Mitsubishi SpaceJet
- Mitsubishi MU-2
- Mitsubishi Mu-300
- Mitsubishi RP-1
- Mitsubishi SX-3
- Mitsubishi T-2
- Mitsubishi A5M
- Mitsubishi A6M Zero Rei-sen
- Mitsubishi A7M Reppu
- Mitsubishi A7M3-J Reppu Kai
- Mitsubishi B1M
- Mitsubishi B2M
- Mitsubishi B4M
- Mitsubishi B5M
- Mitsubishi C1M
- Mitsubishi C5M
- Mitsubishi D3M
- Mitsubishi F1M
- Mitsubishi G1M
- Mitsubishi G3M
- Mitsubishi G4M
- Mitsubishi G4M1 Bomber
- Mitsubishi G6M
- Mitsubishi G7M Taizan
- Mitsubishi J2M Raiden
- Mitsubishi J4M Senden
- Mitsubishi J8M Shusui
- Mitsubishi K3M
- Mitsubishi K6M
- Mitsubishi K7M
- Mitsubishi L4M
- Mitsubishi Q2M Taiyō
- Mitsubishi Ki-1
- Mitsubishi Ki-2
- Mitsubishi Ki-7
- Mitsubishi Ki-14
- Mitsubishi Ki-15
- Mitsubishi Ki-18
- Mitsubishi Ki-20
- Mitsubishi Ki-21
- Mitsubishi Ki-30
- Mitsubishi Ki-33
- Mitsubishi Ki-39
- Mitsubishi Ki-40
- Mitsubishi Ki-46
- Mitsubishi Ki-51
- Mitsubishi Ki-57
- Mitsubishi Ki-67 Hiryu
- Mitsubishi Ki-69
- Mitsubishi Ki-71
- Mitsubishi Ki-73
- Mitsubishi Ki-83
- Mitsubishi Ki-95
- Mitsubishi Ki-97
- Mitsubishi Ki-103
- Mitsubishi Ki-109
- Mitsubishi Ki-112
- Mitsubishi Ki-200
- Mitsubishi Experimental Type R.2
- Mitsubishi Experimental Taka-type Carrier Fighter
- Mitsubishi Experimental Washi-type Light Bomber
- Mitsubishi Experimental Tobi-type Reconnaissance Aircraft
- Mitsubishi Experimental Hayabusa-type Fighter
- Mitsubishi Experimental Short-range Reconnaissance Aircraft
- Mitsubishi Experimental Special-purpose Carrier Reconnaissance Aircraft
- Mitsubishi Army Experimental 9-shi Fighter
- Mitsubishi Army Type Ko 1 Trainer
- Mitsubishi Army Type Ki 1 Trainer
- Mitsubishi Army Type 87 Light Bomber
- Mitsubishi Army Type 92 Heavy Bomber
- Mitsubishi Army Type 92 Reconnaissance Aircraft
- Mitsubishi Army Type 93-1 Heavy Bomber
- Mitsubishi Army Type 93-2 Heavy Bomber
- Mitsubishi Army Type 93-1 Twin-engine Light Bomber
- Mitsubishi Army Type 93-2 Twin-engined Light Bomber
- Mitsubishi Army Type 97 Reconnaissance Aircraft
- Mitsubishi Army Type 97 Heavy Bomber
- Mitsubishi Army Type 97 Light Bomber
- Mitsubishi Army Type 99 Assault Aircraft
- Mitsubishi Army Type 100 Transport Aircraft
- Mitsubishi Army Type 100 Command Reconnaissance Aircraft
- Mitsubishi Army Type 100 Operations Trainer
- Mitsubishi Army Type 100 Air Defence Fighter
- Mitsubishi Army Type 100 Assault Aircraft
- Mitsubishi Army Type 4 Heavy Bomber
- Mitsubishi Army Type 4 Special Attack Aircraft
- Mitsubishi Navy Experimental 7-Shi Carrier Torpedo Bomber
- Mitsubishi Navy Experimental 7-Shi Carrier Attack Aircraft
- Mitsubishi Navy Experimental 7-Shi Carrier Attack Bomber
- Mitsubishi Navy Experimental 7-Shi Twin-engine Carrier Aircraft
- Mitsubishi Navy Experimental 7-Shi Carrier Fighter
- Mitsubishi Navy Experimental 8-Shi Two-seat Fighter
- Mitsubishi Navy Experimental 8-Shi Special Reconnaissance Aircraft
- Mitsubishi Navy Experimental 8-Shi Carrier Fighter
- Mitsubishi Navy Experimental 8-shi Land based Medium Attack Aircraft
- Mitsubishi Navy Experimental 9-Shi Carrier Single-seat Fighter
- Mitsubishi Navy Experimental 9-Shi Single-seat Fighter
- Mitsubishi Navy Experimental 9-Shi Carrier Attack Bomber
- Mitsubishi Navy Experimental 9-Shi Carrier Torpedo Attacker
- Mitsubishi Navy Experimental 9-Shi Land-based Attack Bomber
- Mitsubishi Navy Experimental 10-Shi Carrier Torpedo Attacker
- Mitsubishi Navy Experimental 10-Shi Observation Seaplane
- Mitsubishi Navy Experimental 11-shi Carrier Bomber
- Mitsubishi Navy Experimental 11-shi Crew Trainer
- Mitsubishi Navy Experimental 12-Shi Carrier Fighter
- Mitsubishi Navy Experimental 12-Shi Land-based Attack Aircraft
- Mitsubishi Navy Experimental 14-Shi Interceptor Fighter
- Mitsubishi Navy Experimental 16-shi Attack Bomber Taizan
- Mitsubishi Navy Experimental 17-shi Ko (A) Type Carrier Fighter Reppu
- Mitsubishi Navy Experimental 17-shi Otsu (B) Type Interceptor Fighter Senden
- Mitsubishi Navy Experimental 19-shi Rocket-Powered Interceptor Fighter Shusui
- Mitsubishi Navy Experimental 19-shi Patrol Aircraft Taiyo
- Mitsubishi Navy Experimental 20-shi Ko (A) Type Carrier Fighter Rifuku
- Mitsubishi Navy Type 10 Carrier Fighter
- Mitsubishi Navy Type 10 Carrier Attacker
- Mitsubishi Navy Type 10 Carrier reconnaissance Aircraft
- Mitsubishi Navy Type 13-2 Carrier Attacker
- Mitsubishi Navy Type 13-3 Carrier Attacker
- Mitsubishi Navy Type 87 Light Bomber
- Mitsubishi Navy Type 89-1 Carrier Attacker
- Mitsubishi Navy Type 89-2 Carrier Attacker
- Mitsubishi Navy Type 90-1 Crew Trainer
- Mitsubishi Navy Type 90 Land Transport
- Mitsubishi Navy Type 93 Attack Bomber
- Mitsubishi Navy Type 93 Land-Based Attack Bomber
- Mitsubishi Navy Type 96 Model 11 Carrier Fighter
- Mitsubishi Navy Type 96 Fighter – Trainer
- Mitsubishi Navy Type 96 Land-based Attack Aircraft "Rikko"
- Mitsubishi Navy Type 97-2 Carrier Attacker
- Mitsubishi Navy Type 97 Attack Bomber
- Mitsubishi Navy Type 98 Reconnaissance Aircraft
- Mitsubishi Navy Type 0 Carrier Fighter
- Mitsubishi Navy Type 0 Fighter-Trainer
- Mitsubishi Navy Type 0 Observation Seaplane
- Mitsubishi Navy Type 0 Transport
- Mitsubishi Navy Type 1 Attack Bomber
- Mitsubishi Navy Type 1 Wingtip Convoy Fighter
- Mitsubishi Navy Type 1 Large Land Trainer
- Mitsubishi Navy Type 1 Transport
- Mitsubishi Navy Type 2 Training Fighter
- Mitsubishi Navy Training Fighter
- Mitsubishi Navy Interceptor Fighter Raiden
- Mitsubishi Navy Torpedo Bomber Yasukuni

=== Mix ===
(Arthur "Bert" Mix, Chicago, IL)

- Mix Flying Arrow

=== Mizuno ===
- Mizuno Type 1 suicide rocket glider Shinryū
- Mizuno Type 2 rocket interceptor Shinryū
- Mizuno MXZ1
- Mizuno Navy 17-shi Experimental Plane
