= Mitsubishi Type 92 =

Mitsubishi Type 92 may refer to:

- Mitsubishi Type 92 Reconnaissance Aircraft, Mitsubishi 2MR8, or the radial engine powering the aircraft
- Mitsubishi Type 92 Heavy Bomber, or Mitsubishi Ki-20
