= McDonnell 120 Flying Crane =

General information
- Type: lightweight utility flying-crane helicopter
- National origin: United States
- Manufacturer: McDonnell Aircraft Corporation
- Designer: Lloyd R. Novak
- Number built: 2

The McDonnell 120 Flying Crane, also V-1 Jeep, was a lightweight utility flying crane helicopter designed and built by the McDonnell Aircraft Corporation during the 1950s. The open frame fuselage supported the three gas-producers and main rotor mast, with a small single-seat cockpit in the nose, which was originally open, but later enclosed.

== Development ==
McDonnell had been interested in the flying-crane concept from just after the war, investigating rotors driven directly by ramjets and compressed air tip jets on the McDonnell XH-20 Little Henry, the cancelled McDonnell 79 Big Henry and the McDonnell XV-1 high-speed compound helicopter. The expected advantages included:

1. inherent angle of attack stability
2. increased inherent pitch and roll damping
3. greatly improved dynamic helicopter stability
4. ability to start and stop in high winds;
5. no need for tracking and no dampers required
6. no possibility of mechanical instability or ground resonance;
7. very low vibration
8. low maintenance due to absence of highly loaded bearings, reduction gears, shafting, and anti-torque rotor
9. automatic rotor speed control.

McDonnell started development of a private-venture flying crane helicopter in December 1956, progressing rapidly with a mock-up in January 1957 and the first of two prototypes flying on 13 November 1957, piloted by John R. Noll. The airframe of the Model 120 was very simple, comprising a welded steel-tube open structure, with the three-bladed main-rotor mast and gas-producers attached without covering. Rotor drive was by compressed air rotor-tip jets, fed by three 200 hp (149 kW) gas power AiResearch GTC 85-135 gas-producers.

The Model 120 was only ever intended to carry loads under-slung or attached directly to cargo hooks on the underside of the top fuselage beam, including specialised pods. Although aimed at the US Army the Model 120 was also evaluated by the US Navy at the Naval Air Test Center (NATC), NAS Patuxent River, in September 1959. The Model 120 experienced powerplant problems initially, but demonstrated an excellent load to weight ratio of 1.5:1, but despite the proven performance no orders were forthcoming and cancellation of the project in February 1960 signalled the end of McDonnell's helicopter aspirations.

== Specifications ==
Data from McDonnell Douglas aircraft since 1920 Vol.2.

General characteristics

- Crew: 1
- Length: 20 ft (6.1 m)
- Height: 9 ft 3 in (2.82 m)
- Empty weight: 2,450 lb (1,111 kg)
- Gross weight: 5,000 lb (2,268 kg)
- Max takeoff weight: 6,300 lb (2,858 kg)
- Powerplant: 3 × AiResearch GTC 85-135 gas turbine gas-producers, 200 hp (150 kW) each gas power, delivering 2.2 lb/s (1.0 kg/s) air at 53.6 psi (369.6 kPa), when running at 42,200 rpm at 59 °F (15 °C)
- Main rotor diameter: 3 × 31 ft (9.4 m)
- Main rotor area: 754.8 sq ft (70.12 m^{2})

Performance

- Maximum speed: 138 mph (222 km/h, 120 kn)
- Cruise speed: 109 mph (175 km/h, 95 kn)
- Range: 98 mi (158 km, 85 nmi)
- Rate of climb: 2,400 ft/min (12 m/s)
- Hover ceiling IGE: 12,000 ft (3,658 m)
- Disk loading: 6.6 lb/sq ft (32 kg/m^{2})
