= Miller Red Bare-un =

Sport aircraft

Miller Red Bare-Un

General information
- Type: Sport aircraft
- National origin: United States
- Designer: Merle Miller

History
- First flight: June 1971

The Miller Red Bare-Un was a single seat lightweight sporting monoplane built by Merle Miller in Georgia, USA.

== Design and development ==
Construction began in June 1970 and was completed in May 1971, with the first flight in June of that year. The wings (of 75 sq. ft.) were constructed of Polyethylene terephthalate (dacron)-covered wood ribs and spars, with full span ailerons. The fuselage was of open (uncovered) 4130 steel tube construction. It had tricycle gear with the main gear steel leaf sprung. The engine was a 30 hp (22 kW) Volkswagen air-cooled engine with a wooden tractor propeller mounted in line with the wing and above the pilot, similar to a Santos-Dumont Demoiselle.

The total construction cost was $600. Empty weight was 320 lb (145 kg) and max weight was 550 lb (249 kg). Max speed was 69 mph (111 km/h), with the take-off and landing speed 35 mph (56 km/h). The wing and tail surfaces were shaped in German World War I style, as was the paint scheme.

The single prototype was the only example produced. Plans are not available for sale.

== Specifications ==
Data from Jane's all the world's aircraft 1973-74

General characteristics

- Crew: one
- Length: 13 ft 0 in (3.96 m)
- Wingspan: 22 ft 0 in (6.71 m)
- Height: 5 ft 4 in (1.63 m)
- Wing area: 75 sq ft (7.0 m^{2})
- Airfoil: Clark Y
- Empty weight: 320 lb (145 kg)
- Gross weight: 550 lb (249 kg)
- Fuel capacity: 5.0 U.S. gallons (19 L; 4.2 imp gal)
- Powerplant: 1 × Volkswagen four cylinder, four-stroke aircraft engine, 30 hp (22 kW)
- Propellers: 2-bladed, 4 ft 2 in (1.27 m) diameter

Performance

- Maximum speed: 69 mph (110 km/h, 60 kn)
- Cruise speed: 63 mph (102 km/h, 55 kn)
- Stall speed: 35 mph (56 km/h, 30 kn)
- Range: 144 mi (232 km, 125 nmi)
- Wing loading: 7.33 lb/sq ft (35.8 kg/m^{2})
- Power/mass: 18.35
