= Mikoyan-Gurevich PBSh-1 =

Soviet attack aircraft project

PBSh-1

General information
- Type: Attack aircraft
- National origin: Soviet Union
- Manufacturer: Mikoyan-Gurevich
- Status: Canceled
- Number built: 0

The Mikoyan-Gurevich PBSh-1 (Russian: Микоя́н и Гуре́вич ПБШ-1) was a proposed attack aircraft designed in the Soviet Union.

== Design and development ==
Design work of the PBSh-1 began in January 1940, with the preliminary design by N. Z. Matyuk being approved on 24 July of that year. The aircraft was to have an cantilever inverted gull wing in a low-wing configuration and was to be powered by either a single Mikulin AM-37 or 1,178 kW (1,580 hp) Mikulin AM-38 engine. The engine, single-seat cockpit, as well as other sensitive parts would have been protected by armor plating weighing a total of 1,390 kg (3,060 lb) – about 30% of the aircraft's weight – which would be integrated into the aircraft's structure. The center fuselage and wing section were to be of welded steel-tube construction, while the outer wing panels and rear fuselage were to be wooden. The aircraft was to have conventional landing gear, with the main gear being directly inspired by that of the I-220. Armament was to consist of two 23 mm (0.91 in) Volkov-Yartsev VYa-23 cannons and six 7.62 mm (0.300 in) ShKAS machine guns; all firing outside the propeller arc. The bomber variant would also be capable of carrying a wide variety of demolition or incendiary bombs inside the fuselage bay, plus two bombs under the wings for dive bombing. Work on the PBSh-1 ended as soon as the competing Ilyushin Il-2 was approved for production.

With the cancellation of the PBSh-1, OKB Mikoyan and Gurevich began work on a derivative designated PBSh-2 in July 1940. Unlike its predecessor, the PBSh-2 was to be a biplane, specifically a reverse sesquiplane, with the designers reasoning that biplanes were easier to fly and offered better maneuverability and stability than a monoplane. The large lower wing was to have light dihedral, large ailerons, and two-segment flaps. The smaller upper wing was to be mounted on top of the canopy and have a 12 degree forward sweep. Both wings were to be braces by I-type struts. The engine, center wing section, armor, armament, landing gear, and cockpit would have been identical to the PBSh-1, apart from a jettisonable side door for the pilot. By the end of 1940, all work on the PBSh-2 was canceled due to the lack of available factories to produce the aircraft.

== Variants ==
PBSh-1
Original monoplane design to compete with the Ilyushin Il-2. Not built.
PBSh-2
Biplane development of the PBSh-1. Not built.
MiG-4
Alternative designation of the PBSh-1 used in some Mikoyan and Gurevich documents.
MiG-6
Alternative designation of the PBSh-2 used in some Mikoyan and Gurevich documents.

== Specifications (PBSh-1, estimated) ==
Data from

General characteristics

- Crew: 1
- Length: 10.145 m (33 ft 3.4 in)
- Wingspan: 13.5 m (44 ft 3.5 in)
- Height: 3.2 m (10 ft 6 in)
- Wing area: 30.5 m^{2} (328.3 sq ft)
- Empty weight: 4,850 kg (10,690 lb)
- Max takeoff weight: 6,024 kg (13,277 lb)
- Powerplant: 1 × Mikulin AM-38 12-cylinder piston engine, 1,178 kW (1,600 hp)

Performance

- Maximum speed: 441 km/h (274 mph, 238 kn) at 5,000 m (16,400 ft), 449 km/h (279 mph, 242 kn) at sea level
- Range: 900 km (560 mi, 490 nmi)
- Service ceiling: 7,600 m (25,690 ft)
- Wing loading: 159 kg/m^{2} (32.6 lb/sq ft)

Armament

- Guns:
  - 2× 23 mm (0.91 in) Volkov-Yartsev VYa-23 cannon (96 rounds each)
  - 6× 7.62 mm (0.300 in) ShKAS machine gun (750 rounds each)
- Bombs:
  - Internal fuselage bay (possible payloads)
    - 24× 8 kg (18 lb) FAB-8 demolition bomb
    - 24× 10 kg (22 lb) FAB-10 demolition bomb
    - 280× 2.5 kg (5.5 lb) FAB-2.5 demolition bomb
    - 120× 1 kg (2.2 lb) ZAB-1 incendiary bomb
  - Wing pylons
    - 2× 25 to 250 kg (55–551 lb) FAB demolition bomb
    - 12× RS-82 rockets
