= Southern Air Boss =

Air Boss
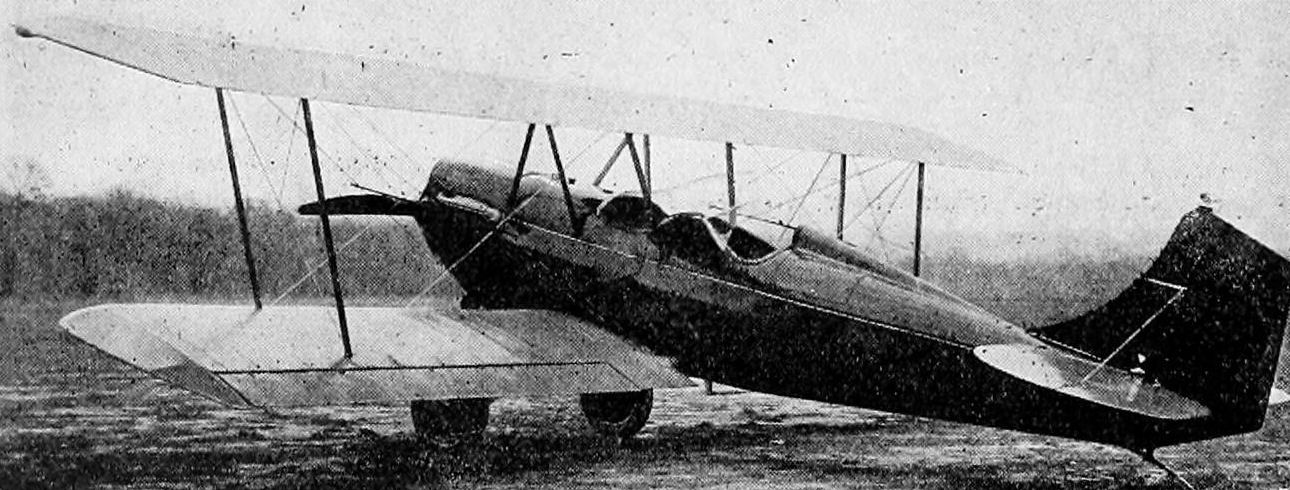

General information
- Type: trainer aircraft
- National origin: US
- Manufacturer: Messer Aeronautical Industries Inc.
- Designer: Glenn E. Messer
- Number built: one

History
- First flight: c.1928

The Southern Air Boss was a 1920s U.S. biplane trainer aircraft. One prototype was built and by 1929 a new factory was ready for its production but this did not follow.

== Design and development ==
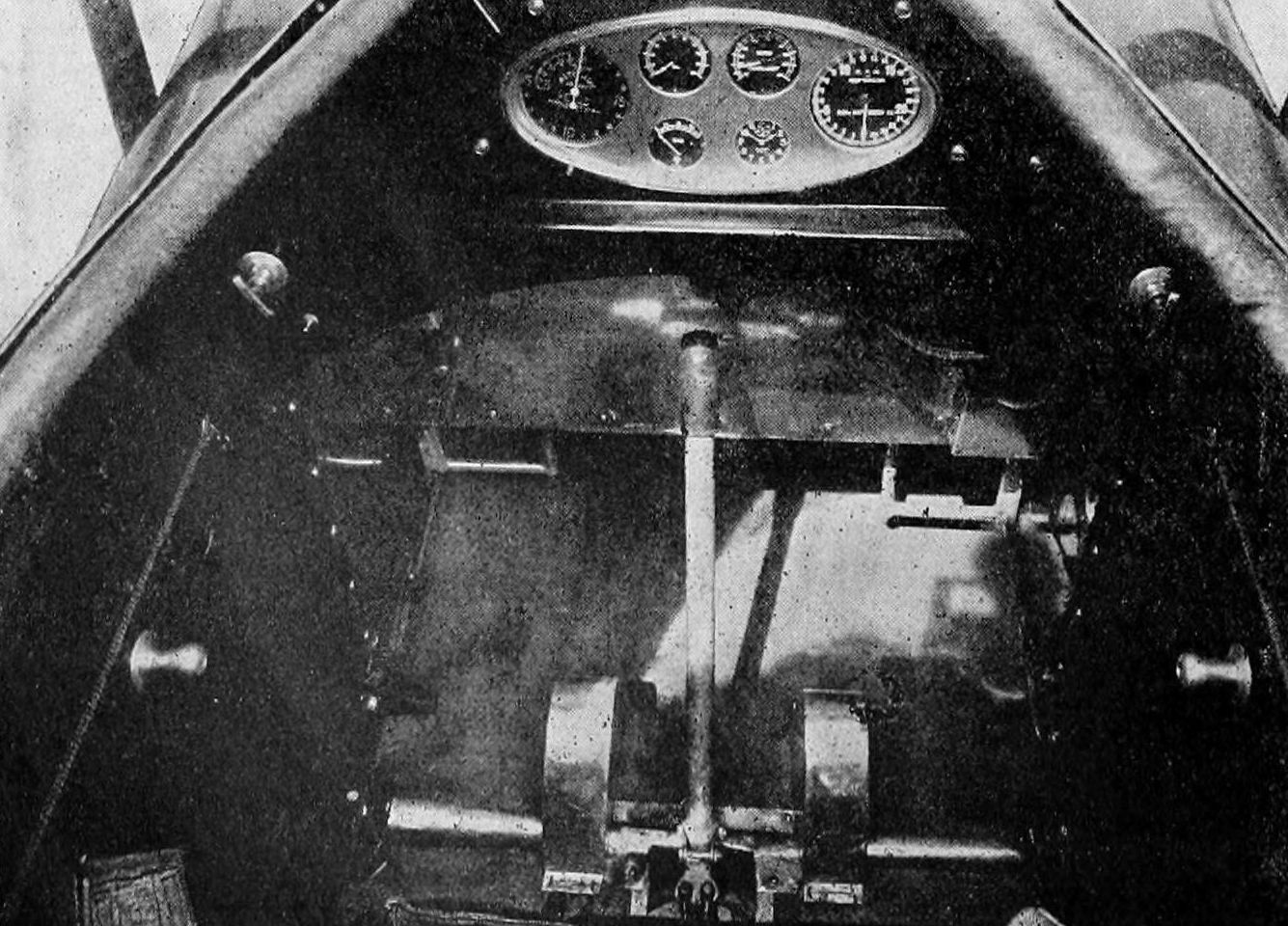
Rear cockpit

The two seat Air Boss was one of many 1920s small U.S. biplanes powered by the aged but cheap and readily available war-surplus 100 hp (75 kW) Curtiss OX-5. It was first flown near the start of the Great Depression and only the prototype was completed.

It was a single bay biplane with pairs of parallel interplane struts between the spars. The lower wings were mounted on the lower fuselage longerons and the upper centre section was held by a cabane formed by pairs of inverted, longitudinal, V-struts to the forward spars and single struts to the rear spars. The wings were both of blunted rectangular plan and had the same chord (60 in (1.5 m)), though the upper span was about 5% greater. All leading edges were plywood-covered. Only the lower wings were fitted with ailerons, which were full span and of the Frise type. One advantage of this arrangement was that the control column to aileron connection was very short.

The V-8 OX-5 was nose-mounted with its radiator, equipped with shutters, underneath it. The fuselage was a chrome-molybdenum steel tube structure with the pupil's open cockpit over the wing and the instructor's close behind but with a much better all-round view. Both cockpits had windscreens and streamlined headrests and dual controls were fitted. The tail was conventional, with a tailplane mounted on top of the fuselage and braced to the fin, which carried an angular rudder. Both fin and tailplane were in-flight adjustable.

The mainwheels of the Air Boss were on a split axle providing a track of 6 ft (1.8 m). There was a long, spring steel tailskid.

The Air Boss prototype was designed by Glenn E. Messer in about 1927 and built by Messer Aeronautical Industries Inc. The date of its first flight is not known but in 1928 Messer founded the Southern Aircraft Co. of Birmingham, Alabama. By mid-1929 they occupied a newly built factory there, complete with construction jigs ready for production, but there is no record of any production aircraft.

== Specifications ==
Data from Aero Digest August 1929

General characteristics

- Crew: Two
- Upper wingspan: 32 ft 4.5 in (9.868 m)
- Lower wingspan: 30 ft 9 in (9.37 m)
- Height: 9 ft 5.5 in (2.883 m)
- Wing area: 298 sq ft (27.7 m^{2})
- Empty weight: 1,350 lb (612 kg)
- Gross weight: 2,200 lb (998 kg)
- Powerplant: 1 × Curtiss OX-5 liquid cooled V8 engine, 90 hp (67 kW) continuous at 1,400 rpm
- Propellers: 2-bladed

Performance

- Cruise speed: 90 mph (140 km/h, 78 kn)
- Take-off distance: 100 ft (30 m)}
- Landing speed: 30 mph (48 km/h)
- Endurance: 8 hr at cruising speed
- Service ceiling: 17,000 ft (5,200 m)
- Rate of climb: 1,000 ft/min (5.1 m/s) initial
