= Mitsubishi B4M =

Japanese torpedo bomber

B4M
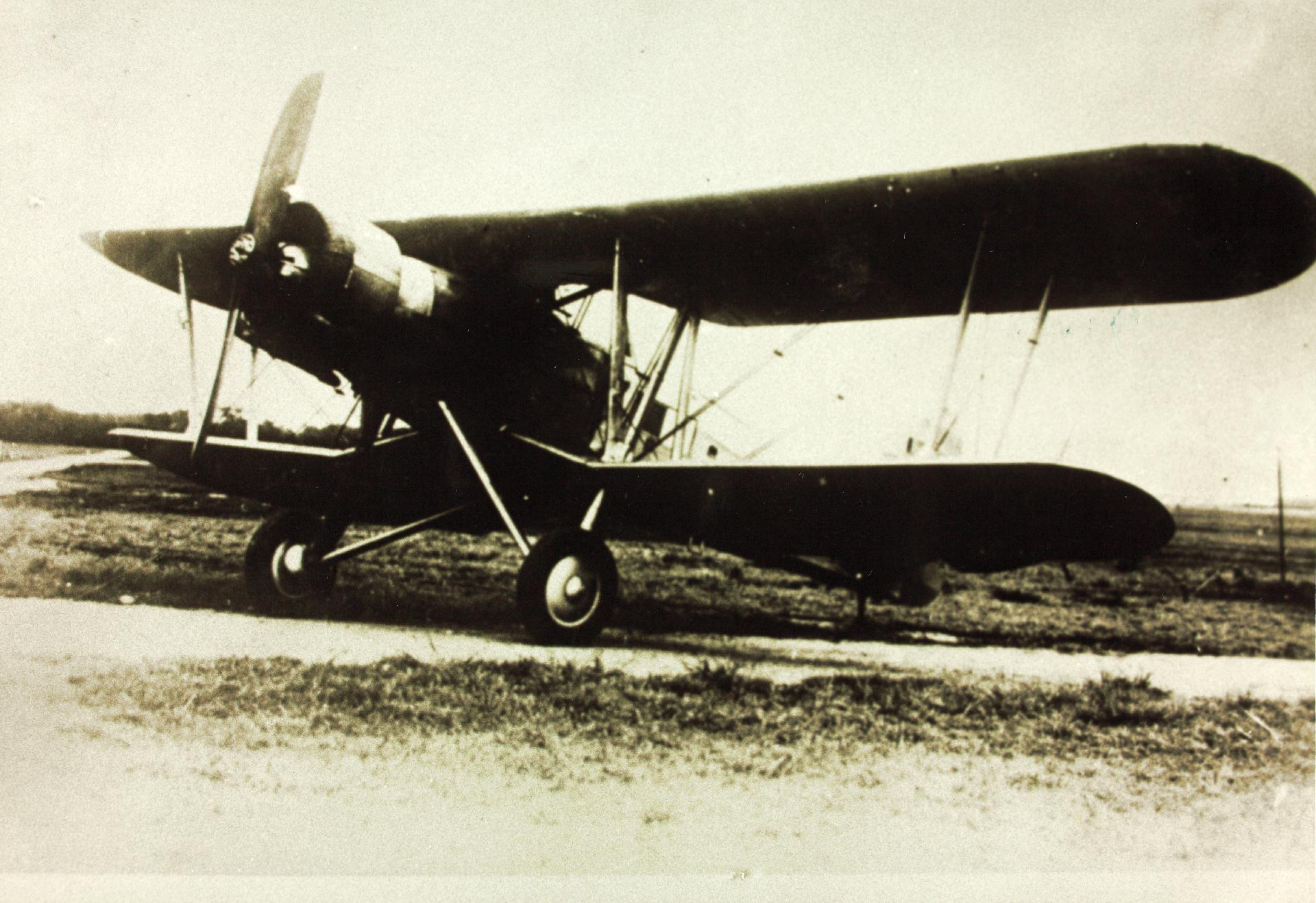

General information
- Type: Torpedo bomber
- Manufacturer: Mitsubishi
- Designer: Hajime Matsuhara
- Primary user: Imperial Japanese Navy
- Number built: 2

History
- First flight: August 1934
- Developed from: Mitsubishi 3MT10

The Mitsubishi Ka-12 or B4M was a Japanese carrier-based torpedo bomber of 1934. Two prototypes were built by Mitsubishi for the Imperial Japanese Navy. A development of the company's 3MT10 of 1932, the design differed primarily in the use of a radial engine and metal wing, which made the whole aircraft significantly lighter and faster. However, the design could not realise its potential as the wing was inefficiently stiff and the B4M was not selected for production. The competing Yokosuka B4Y was chosen to serve on the Navy's aircraft carriers instead.

== Design and development ==
In 1933, the Japanese Navy still relied on the Mitsubishi B1M as the backbone of its carrier-borne attack force. The Yokosuka B3Y was starting to enter service, developed in response to the 7-shi, competition. However, already, the new aircraft was suffering engine reliability and other problems, and an early replacement was deemed expedient. The B3Y had seen off competition from Mitsubishi and Nakajima, and both were invited, along with Yokosuka, to enter a design to the ensuing 9-shi competition in February 1934.

In response, Mitsubishi submitted a design based on their unsuccessful 7-shi entry, the 3MT10. However, instead of the bulky Rolls-Royce Buzzard V-12, a less powerful but lighter experimental Mitsubishi 8-Shi radial engine was fitted. Despite having an expected power rating of 650 hp (480 kW), substantially less than the 835 hp (623 kW) of the Buzzard, the much reduced weight enabled the designer Hajime Matsuhara to substantially reduce the total weight of the aircraft by 590 kg (1,300 lb). Weight-saving measures included introducing aluminium wings and removing the wheel fairings. Overall, the effect of these changes were to increase the theoretical speed to 270 kilometres per hour (170 mph).

Matsuhara's final Ka-12 design was a single bay biplane of composite construction, with a fabric covered wooden frame fuselage and metal upper wings. The lower wings were of a new inverse gull shape, with fixed undercarriage attached to the wing and fuselage. The undercarriage had a wide track to allow for the carriage of a single 800 kg (1,800 lb) torpedo or the equivalent weight in free-fall bombs. The three crew were seated in open cockpits and shared a total of three 7.7 mm (0.30 in) machine guns, two mounted on flexible mounts firing aft and a single fixed mounting firing forward.

== Operational history ==
The first prototype was completed and first flew in August 1934. The aircraft was designated B4M1 by the Navy and flown against designs from both Nakajima and Yokosuka. Performance was considered superior to the aircraft in service, but the aircraft was unstable and difficult to fly. The lack of stiffness in the aluminium wing caused problems and the aircraft could not safely fly at its theoretical maximum speed. A second prototype designated was built with design changes, including a new nose fairing for the engine and a tailwheel instead of a skid, but these did not solve all the problems. The Navy rejected the design and the competing Yokosuka B4Y was chosen for production instead. However, Mitsubishi did gain some consolation from the outcome as they eventually produced 135 of the Yokosuka type.

== Operators ==
Japan

- Imperial Japanese Navy

== Specifications (B4M1) ==
Data from Japanese Aircraft 1910-1941

General characteristics

- Crew: 3
- Length: 9.96 m (32 ft 8 in)
- Wingspan: 14.80 m (48 ft 7 in)
- Height: 3.94 m (12 ft 11 in)
- Wing area: 54.00 m^{2} (581.3 sq ft)
- Empty weight: 2,000 kg (4,409 lb)
- Gross weight: 3,824 kg (8,430 lb)
- Powerplant: 1 × Mitsubishi 8-Shi 14-cylinder air-cooled radial piston engine, 480 kW (650 hp)

Performance

- Maximum speed: 241 km/h (150 mph, 130 kn)
- Cruise speed: 185 km/h (115 mph, 100 kn)
- Endurance: 6 hours 10 minutes
- Time to altitude: 14 minutes 33 seconds to 3,000 m (9,800 ft)

Armament

- Guns: 1 × forward firing 2 × flexible 7.7 mm (0.30 in) machine guns in rear cockpit
- Bombs: 1 × 800 kg (1,800 lb) torpedo or equivalent weight of bombs

== See also ==
Aircraft of comparable role, configuration, and era

- Blackburn Shark
- Fairey Swordfish
- Yokosuka B4Y

Related lists

- List of carrier-based aircraft
- List of military aircraft of Japan
