= Meckler-Allen 1912 Biplane =

Meckler-Allen Biplane "New York"
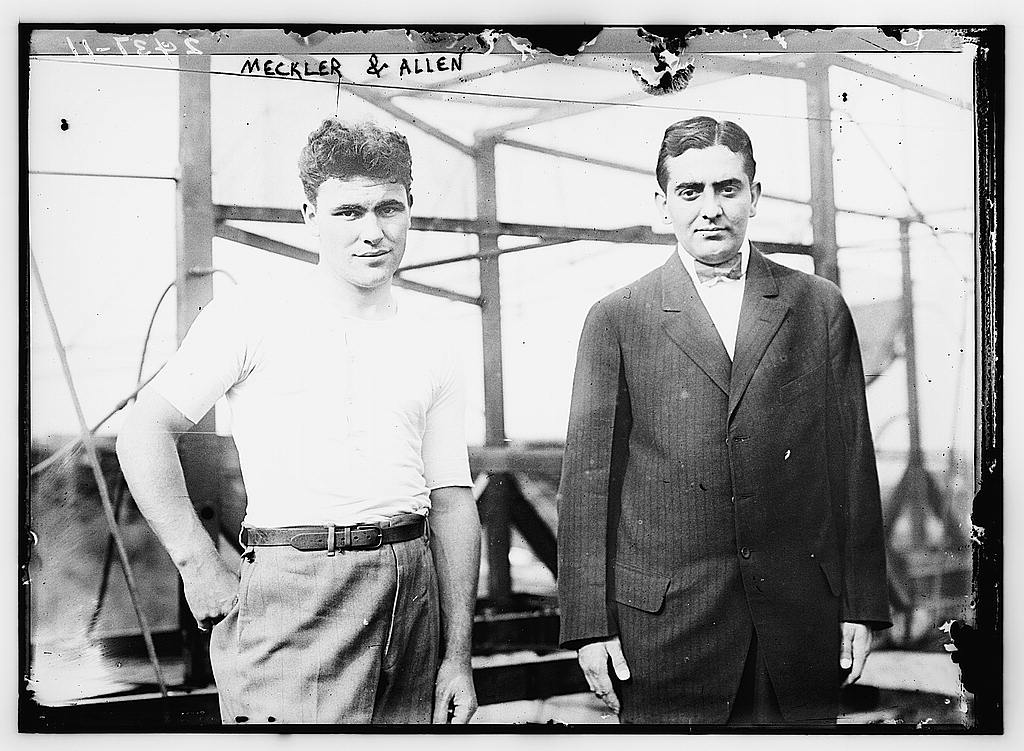
- John Meckler and Allen Canton, 1910–1915

General information
- Type: Biplane
- National origin: United States
- Designer: Allen Canton and John J. Meckler
- Number built: 1

The Meckler-Allen airplane was an early biplane built by Allen Canton and John J. Meckler in 1912, for an attempt to make a transatlantic flight. At the time of its first flight it was the largest airplane in the world.

== History ==
In 1912, Allen Canton and John J. Meckler, two young Bronx electricians, built a 76-foot (23 m) span hydro-biplane. The financing for the construction came from profits of their company Mechelectric, which held forty-five patents for new electrical devices. The partners planned to make the first transatlantic flight to Europe.

Christened the New York, it carried twenty-two tanks of gasoline and had five engines, was 104 feet (32 m) long, had a 76-foot (23 m) span, and contained 2,400 square feet (220 m^{2}) of canvas, with an estimated lifting capacity of 20,000 pounds (9,100 kg) when only two of the five engines were running.

== Specifications (Meckler-Allen Biplane) ==
General characteristics

- Length: 104 ft (32 m)
- Wingspan: 76 ft (23 m)
- Powerplant: 4 × Flight engines , 125 hp (93 kW) each
- Powerplant: 1 × Ground engine , 65 hp (48 kW)
- Propellers: 2-bladed Meckler-Allen, 12 ft (3.7 m) diameter

Performance

- Maximum speed: 109 kn (125 mph, 201 km/h)
- Cruise speed: 65 kn (75 mph, 121 km/h)
