= Mitsubishi 2MR =

Japanese reconnaissance aircraft

2MR
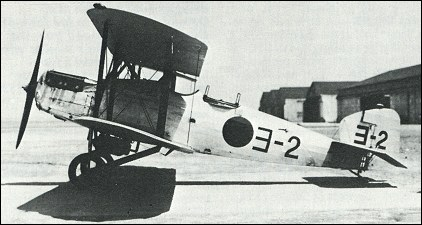

General information
- Type: Reconnaissance Aircraft
- Manufacturer: Mitsubishi
- Designer: Herbert Smith
- Primary user: Imperial Japanese Navy
- Number built: 159

History
- First flight: 12 January 1922

The Mitsubishi 2MR was a Japanese carrier-based reconnaissance aircraft of the 1920s, also known as the Navy Type 10 Carrier Reconnaissance Aircraft or the C1M in the Navy's short designation scheme. Designed for Mitsubishi by the British aircraft designer Herbert Smith, the 2MR was used by the Imperial Japanese Navy through the 1920s and 1930s.

== Development and design ==
In 1921, the Imperial Japanese Navy placed an order with the newly established aircraft subsidiary of Mitsubishi for three types of carrier-based aircraft, consisting of a fighter, reconnaissance aircraft and torpedo bomber. Mitsubishi hired a team of British engineers led by Herbert Smith, formerly of Sopwith Aviation Company to design these aircraft. Smith's design for a reconnaissance aircraft, designated by Mitsubishi the 2MR, first flew on 12 January 1922.

The 2MR was of similar layout to the contemporary 1MF fighter (i.e. a single-bay wooden biplane), but scaled up to accommodate a two-man crew, and was powered by a similar license-built Hispano-Suiza engine. After successful testing, the 2MR was adopted by the Japanese Navy as the Navy Type 10 Carrier Reconnaissance Aircraft (Type 10 referring to the year of ordering of 1921, the tenth year of the Taishō period), with production continuing until 1930, a total of 159 being built.

In 1930, Mitsubishi developed two aircraft to meet an Imperial Japanese Army Air Force requirement for a short-range reconnaissance aircraft, the 2MR7, a biplane developed from the 2MR and the B2M torpedo bomber and the 2MR8 parasol monoplane, with the 2MR8 being successful and ordered into service as the Type 92 Reconnaissance Aircraft. This aircraft was unrelated to the Navy 2MR aircraft.

== Operational history ==
The biplane series of the 2MR continued in service aboard Japan's aircraft carriers through the 1920s and into the 1930s, with versions being used as intermediate trainers until the late-1930s. Many were converted to civil use, being used both as trainers and for communications purposes for newspaper companies. Some remained in civilian service until 1938.

== Variants ==
2MR1
Initial version, Navy designation Type 10-1. Fitted with car type honeycomb radiator at front of engine.
2MR2
Revised version, with original car type radiator replaced by Lamblin radiator beneath fuselage and relocated pilot's seat. Type 10-2.
2MR3
Increased tail area, radiator moved forward.
2MR4
Definitive carrier reconnaissance version. Rounded wingtips and re-located pilot's seat.
Karigane
Improved prototype of 1928 for reconnaissance aircraft for both Navy and Army. One only built.
2MRT1
Intermediate trainer version of 2MR1.
2MRT1A
Intermediate trainer, revised tail surfaces.
2MRT2
Intermediate trainer version of 2MR2.
2MRT2A
Trainer version of 2MR3.
2MRT3
Further revised intermediate trainer. Radiators relocated under wings.
2MRT3A
Final Trainer version. Fitted with night flying equipment and floatation gear.
R-1.2 Trainer
Civil trainer conversion of Type 10-1.
R-2.2 Trainer
Civil trainer conversion of Type 10-2.
Mitsubishi R-4
Conversion of 2MR4 for civil survey operations with enclosed cockpit. Two converted.
2MR7
Short-range reconnaissance biplane for Japanese Army – based on 2MR and B2M
2MR8
Parasol monoplane reconnaissance aircraft for Army – unrelated to 2MR biplane.

== Operators ==
Japan

- Imperial Japanese Navy Air Service

== Specifications (2MR) ==
Data from Japanese Aircraft 1910-1941

General characteristics

- Crew: 2
- Length: 7.93 m (26 ft 0 in)
- Wingspan: 12.04 m (39 ft 6 in)
- Wing area: 37.7 m^{2} (406 sq ft)
- Empty weight: 980 kg (2,161 lb)
- Gross weight: 1,320 kg (2,910 lb)
- Powerplant: 1 × Mitsubishi Hi V-8 water-cooled piston engine, 224 kW (300 hp)

Performance

- Maximum speed: 204 km/h (127 mph, 110 kn)
- Endurance: 3½ hours
- Time to altitude: 3,000 m (9,800 ft) in 17 minutes
- Wing loading: 35 kg/m^{2} (7.2 lb/sq ft)
- Power/mass: 0.17 kW/kg (0.10 hp/lb)

Armament

- Guns: 2 fixed forward firing 7.7 mm machine guns and two flexibly mounted 7.7 mm machine guns in observers cockpit
- Bombs: 3x 30 kg (66 lb) bombs

== See also ==
Related development

- Mitsubishi 1MF
