= Micronautix Triton =

Triton
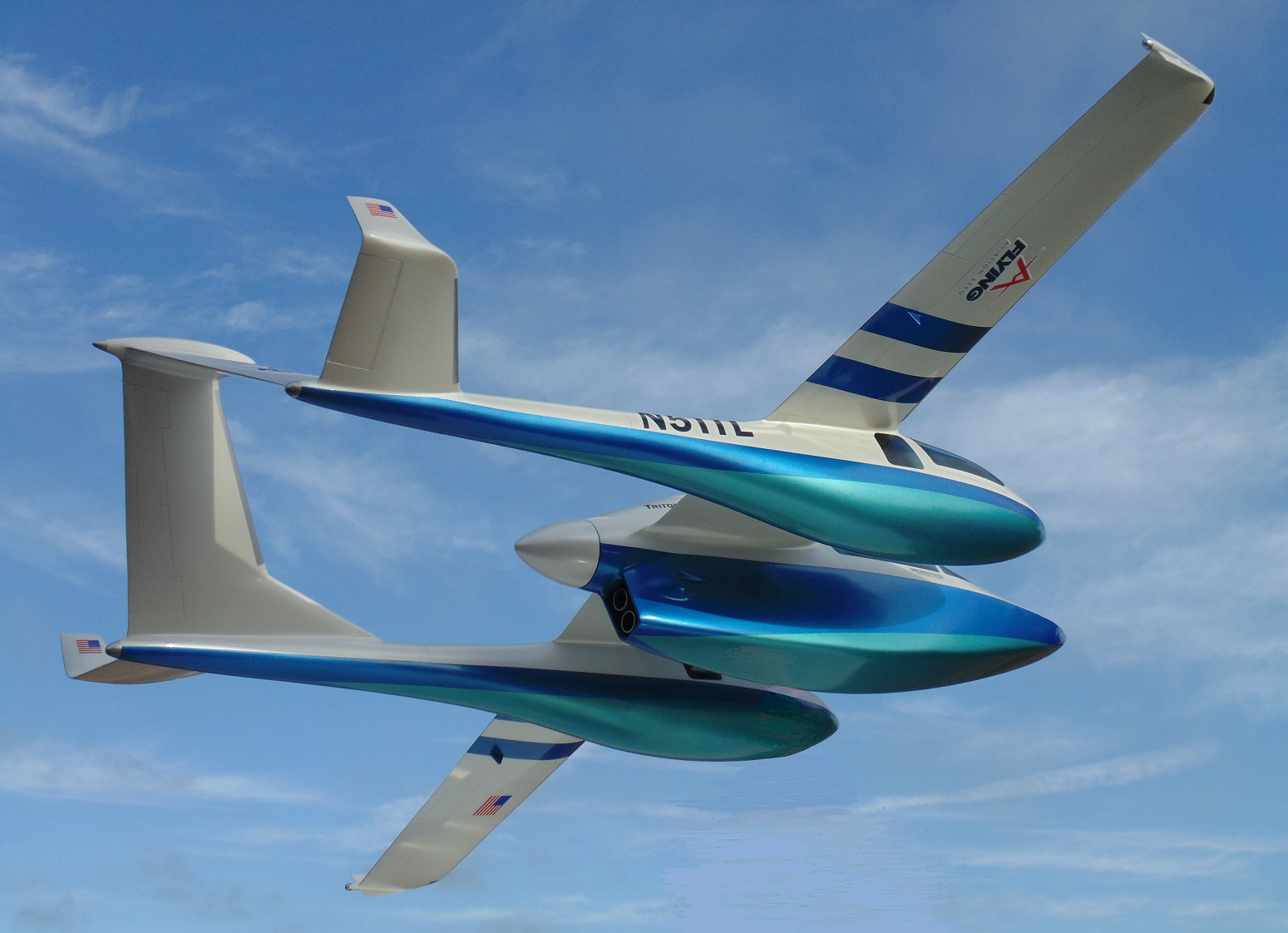
- Two normal size passengers fit in tandem seating in the two outer cabins. One passenger sits behind the pilot in the center cabin.

General information
- Type: Light aircraft
- National origin: United States
- Manufacturer: Micronautix
- Status: In development

The Micronautix Triton is an American 3-5 passenger sightseeing and flight experience aircraft.

== Design and development ==
The Triton is a single engine pusher aircraft with three fuselage sections joined by a mid-wing and a Double-V shaped tailplane. Amphibian and electric hybrid variants are planned. A ballistic parachute will be integrated into the design. Under development by Micronautix, a division of Bob Smith Industries, Inc.

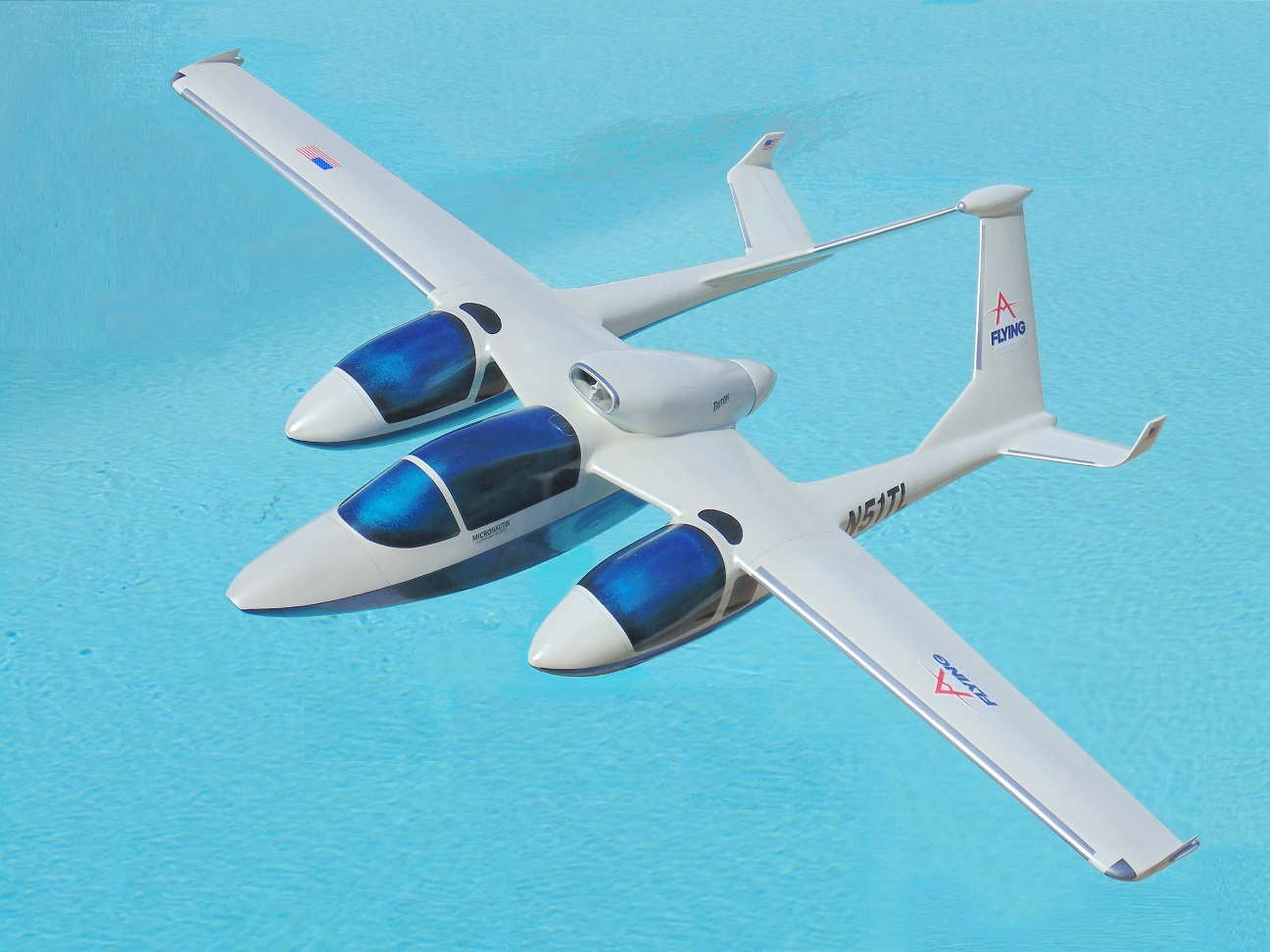
A turbofan powered Triton could lead to an amphibious version.

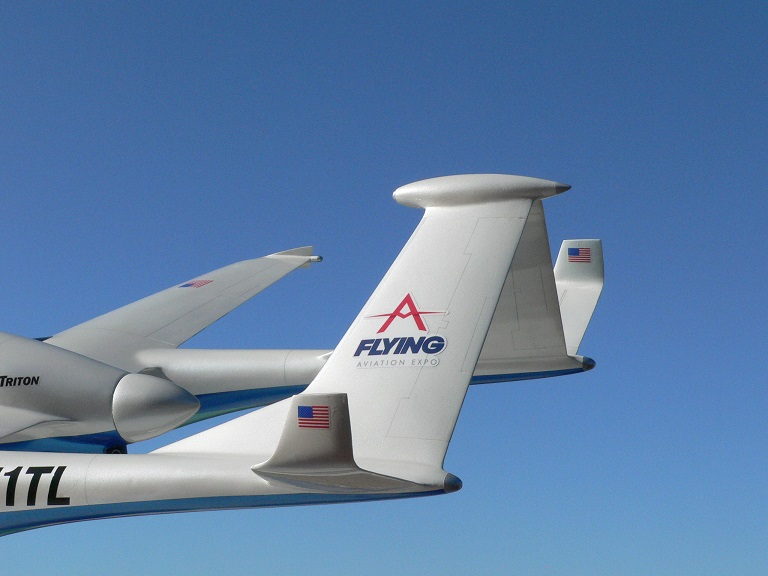
The Triton has an unusual double-V tail.

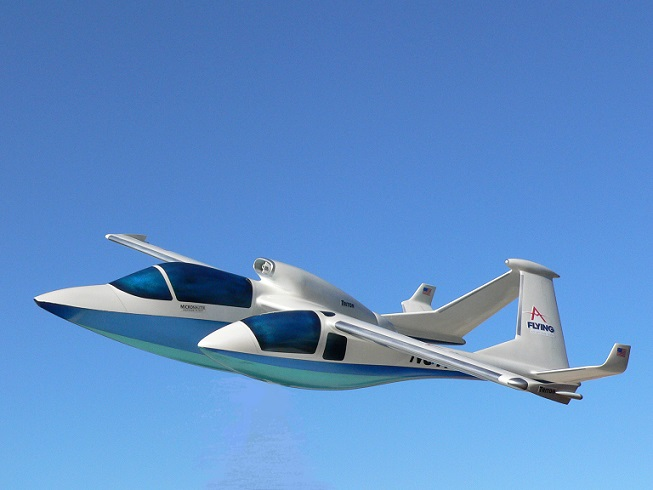
Future hybrid versions of the Rolls-Royce turboprop will give 20 minutes of near silent flight over viewing areas.

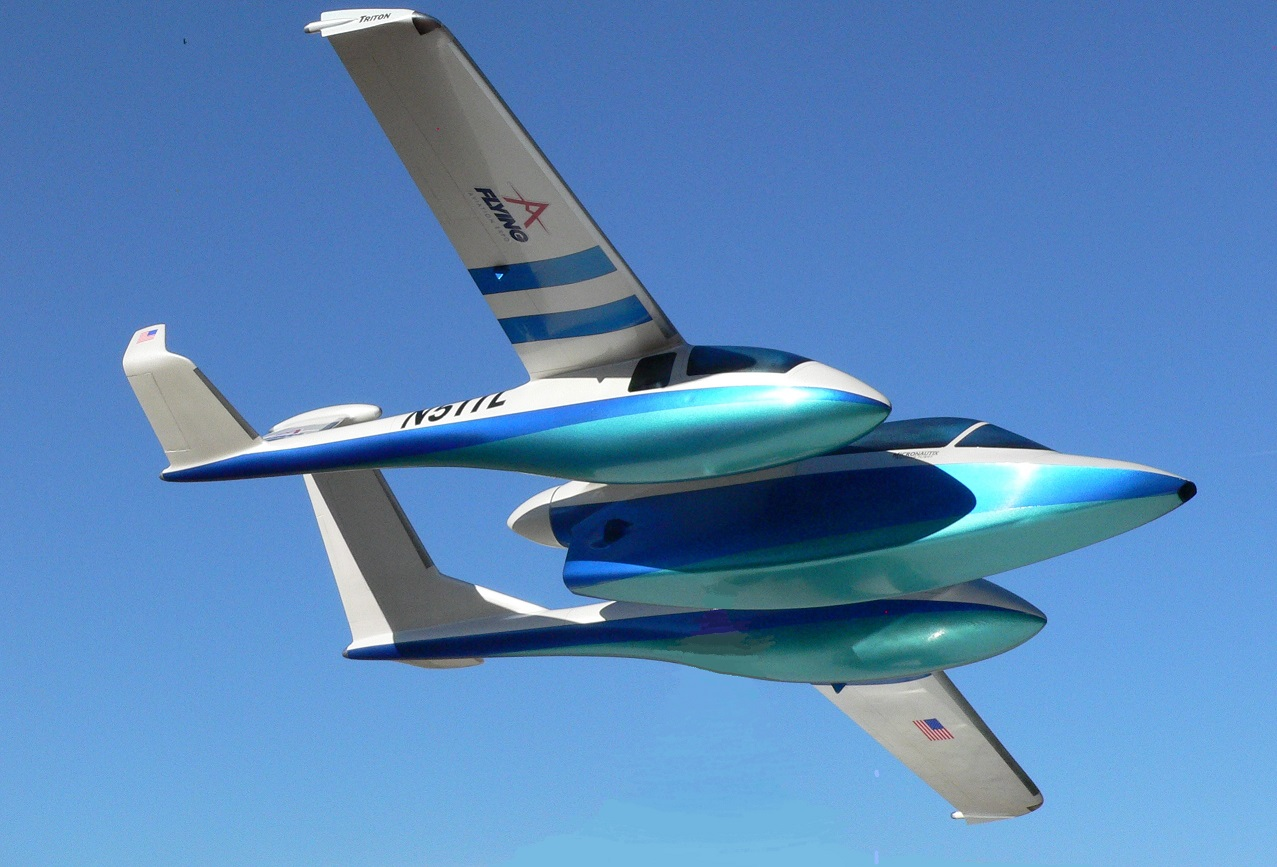
The Triton is a flight experience aircraft that will link passengers to the magic of flying.

== Specifications (Triton) ==
Data from AOPA

General characteristics

- Crew: 1
- Capacity: 4-6
- Length: 35 ft (11 m)
- Wingspan: 42 ft (13 m)
- Height: 11.75 ft (3.58 m)
- Wing area: 196 sq ft (18.2 m^{2})
- Airfoil: NACA 63-415
- Empty weight: 2,855 lb (1,295 kg)
- Gross weight: 4,305 lb (1,953 kg)
- Powerplant: 1 × Rolls-Royce M250-B17F/2 turboprop, 450 hp (340 kW)

Performance

- Cruise speed: 155 kn (178 mph, 287 km/h)
- Stall speed: 60 kn (69 mph, 110 km/h)
- Range: 820 nmi (940 mi, 1,520 km)

== See also ==
- North American Rockwell OV-10 Bronco Twin-boom retractable turboprop

Aircraft Masterpiece http://luxebeatmag.com/wp-content/uploads/2014/06/Triton.pdfJetGala Magazine https://web.archive.org/web/20141107233317/http://www.jetgala.com/downloads/PDF-Jetgala-Magazine-Issue-21.pdfhttps://www.bsi-inc.com/triton.html
