= Merville SM.31 =

French single seat glider, 1960

SM.31

General information
- Type: High performance glider
- National origin: France
- Manufacturer: Helice G. Merville
- Designer: R. Cartier
- Number built: 1

History
- First flight: 11 January 1960
- Developed from: Merville S.30

The Merville SM.31 is a French high performance glider with a laminar flow wing, first flown in 1960. Only one was built.

== Design and development ==
In the 1960s, André Merville was president of the Boulogne- based company Helice G. Merville, which had been the chief supplier of wooden propellers for French aircraft since the end of World War I. He sought to broaden the firm's product range by producing both light aircraft and gliders. The SM.31 high-performance sailplane was a development of their S.30 (sometimes written SM.30).

It is a wood-framed aircraft, covered with a mixture of plywood and fabric. Its wing was built around a single spar with ply covering from the spar around the leading edge and fabric aft. The smooth ply skin covers just over half the chord, matching the approximate distance over which the ideal NACA airfoil 65_{4}421 maintains laminar flow; the rest is fabric-covered, though the covering of the plain ailerons is a ply and fabric mixture. In plan the wing has a rectangular centre section reaching out to about 60% of the span. Its square tipped outer sections have a swept leading edge, giving them a 6° sweep at quarter chord and a taper ratio of 65%. The ailerons are each in two parts, operating differentially and occupying about 63% of the span; the rest of the trailing edge is filled with lift-increasing Fowler flaps. There are Schempp-Hirth type air brakes on the inner section at 57% chord. The wings are shoulder mounted with a dihedral of 2.5°.

The fuselage of the SM.31 is ply covered over wooden frames and stringers. In section it is ovoid, deep and narrow in the single-seat cockpit area ahead of the wings. Its single-piece, blown perspex canopy occupies most of this forward region. It has a rounded profile which curves upwards into the upper fuselage line just ahead of the wing and is side opening. Aft, the fuselage tapers slowly to the tail, where the straight tapered tailplane and elevators are mounted on top. The fin is faired into the fuselage at its root but elsewhere the vertical tail is straight tapered and flat topped. The rudder, hinged behind the elevator trailing edge and extending down to the keel, is not balanced. All the fixed tail surfaces are ply covered, with fabric covered control surfaces. The SM.31 lands on a semi-recessed, unsprung monowheel, fitted with brakes and assisted by a fixed skid which stretches from nose the under the wing trailing edge together with a tail bumper protecting the rudder.

The SM.31's first flight was made on 11 January 1960. The sole example still exists, though neither airworthy nor on display. Whether it is F-CCHN in the Ailes Ancienne collection in Toulouse or F-CBYK at the Musée Régional de l'Air at Angers is not certain; one is probably the SM.30 and the other the SM.31.

== Specifications ==
Data from The World's Sailplanes II (1963) p.84-5

General characteristics

- Crew: One
- Length: 8.10 m (26 ft 7 in)
- Wingspan: 18.06 m (59 ft 3 in)
- Height: 1.80 m (5 ft 11 in) over tail
- Wing area: 18.0 m^{2} (194 sq ft)
- Aspect ratio: 18
- Airfoil: NACA airfoil 65_{4}421 at root, 64_{3}618 at tip
- Empty weight: 360 kg (794 lb) equipped
- Max takeoff weight: 460 kg (1,014 lb)
- Maximum wing loading: 25.5 kg/m^{2} (5.24 lb/sqft)

Performance

- Maximum speed: 220 km/h (140 mph, 120 kn) placard, smooth air
- Maximimum speed: 180 km/h (112 mph) placard, rough air
- Aerotowing speed: 100 km/h (62 mph)
- Winch launch speed: 100 km/h (62 mph)
- g limits: +5/-2
- Maximum glide ratio: maximum 32.5:1, at 98 km/h (61 mph) and a weight of 440 kg (970 lb)
- Rate of sink: 0.78 m/s (154 ft/min) minimum, at 80 km/h (50 mph) and a weight of 440 kg (970 lb), with no flaps
