= Mentzel Baltic Fox =

German ultralight aircraft

Baltic Fox

General information
- Type: Ultralight aircraft and light-sport aircraft
- National origin: Germany
- Manufacturer: Ing Büro Mentzel
- Designer: Anno Claus Mentzel
- Status: In production (2012)

History
- Introduction date: 2009

The Mentzel Baltic Fox is a German ultralight and light-sport flying boat that was designed by Anno Claus Mentzel and produced by Ing Büro Mentzel of Prinzhöfte, certified in 2009. The aircraft is supplied as a complete ready-to-fly-aircraft, disassembled for transport.

== Design and development ==
The Baltic Fox was designed as a specialist aircraft for use by expeditions and, as such, it was intended to be disassembled for shipping in boxes to its destination and then rapidly reassembled and flown. It was intended to comply with the Fédération Aéronautique Internationale microlight rules and US light-sport aircraft rules. It features a strut-braced high-wing, a two-seats-in-side-by-side configuration open cockpit, retractible tricycle landing gear and a single engine in pusher configuration.

The aircraft is made from bolted-together aluminum tubing, with its flying surfaces covered in Dacron sailcloth. Its 10 m (32.8 ft) span wing has an area of 16.1 m^{2} (173 sq ft). The standard engine available is the 84 hp (63 kW) Hirth 3702 three cylinder two-stroke powerplant.

== Variants ==
Baltic Fox
Initial model, flying boat only, without wheeled landing gear. Certified in Germany as an ultralight in 2009.
Baltic Fox Sea
Second model, amphibious flying boat with wheeled landing gear, undergoing ultralight certification in 2011.

== Specifications (Baltic Fox) ==
Data from Bayerl and Tacke

General characteristics

- Crew: one
- Capacity: one passenger
- Wingspan: 10.0 m (32 ft 10 in)
- Wing area: 16.1 m^{2} (173 sq ft)
- Empty weight: 330 kg (728 lb)
- Gross weight: 517.5 kg (1,141 lb)
- Fuel capacity: 60 litres (13 imp gal; 16 US gal)
- Powerplant: 1 × Hirth 3702 three cylinder, air-cooled, two stroke aircraft engine, 60 kW (80 hp)

Performance

- Maximum speed: 140 km/h (87 mph, 76 kn)
- Cruise speed: 120 km/h (75 mph, 65 kn)
- Stall speed: 55 km/h (34 mph, 30 kn)
- Wing loading: 32.1 kg/m^{2} (6.6 lb/sq ft)
