= MCC Aviation =

MCC Aviation SA
- Company type: Société Anonyme
- Industry: Aerospace
- Headquarters: Grandvaux, Switzerland
- Key people: Paul Amiell, designer
- Products: Paragliders
- Website: www.mccaviation.ch

MCC Aviation SA (sometimes Mcc) is a Swiss aircraft manufacturer based in Grandvaux. The company specializes in the design and manufacture of paragliders in the form of ready-to-fly aircraft, as well as paragliding harnesses, rescue parachutes and paragliding accessories.

The company is a Société Anonyme, a Swiss limited company.

The company introduced the intermediate Boléa, designed by Paul Amiell, in the mid-2000s and then expanded the range to include higher performance gliders and two-seaters.

MCC's production facility is ISO 9001-2001 certified.

== Aircraft ==
Summary of aircraft built by MCC:

- MCC Amaya
- MCC Arolla
- MCC Beluga
- MCC Boléa
- MCC Insigia
- MCC Maluga
- MCC Orbea
