= McDonnell XHCH =

Proposed helicopter

XHCH

General information
- Type: Aerial crane helicopter
- National origin: United States
- Manufacturer: McDonnell Aircraft
- Status: Cancelled; mockup phase only
- Primary user: United States Navy

The McDonnell XHCH (Model 86) was a 1950s aerial crane helicopter proposal for the United States Navy by the McDonnell Corporation.

== Development ==
The XHCH was developed in the early 1950s to meet a US Navy requirement for a helicopter capable of carrying supplies and ammunition between ships and carrying heavy loads for short distances from ship-to-shore or from marshalling areas ashore to front-line units. Three prototypes (BuNos 138654/138656) were ordered, and a full-size mockup was inspected in May 1953. However, budget cuts forced the Navy to cancel the XHCH-1 project on January 18, 1959, without a prototype being built.

== Specifications (XHCH estimated) ==
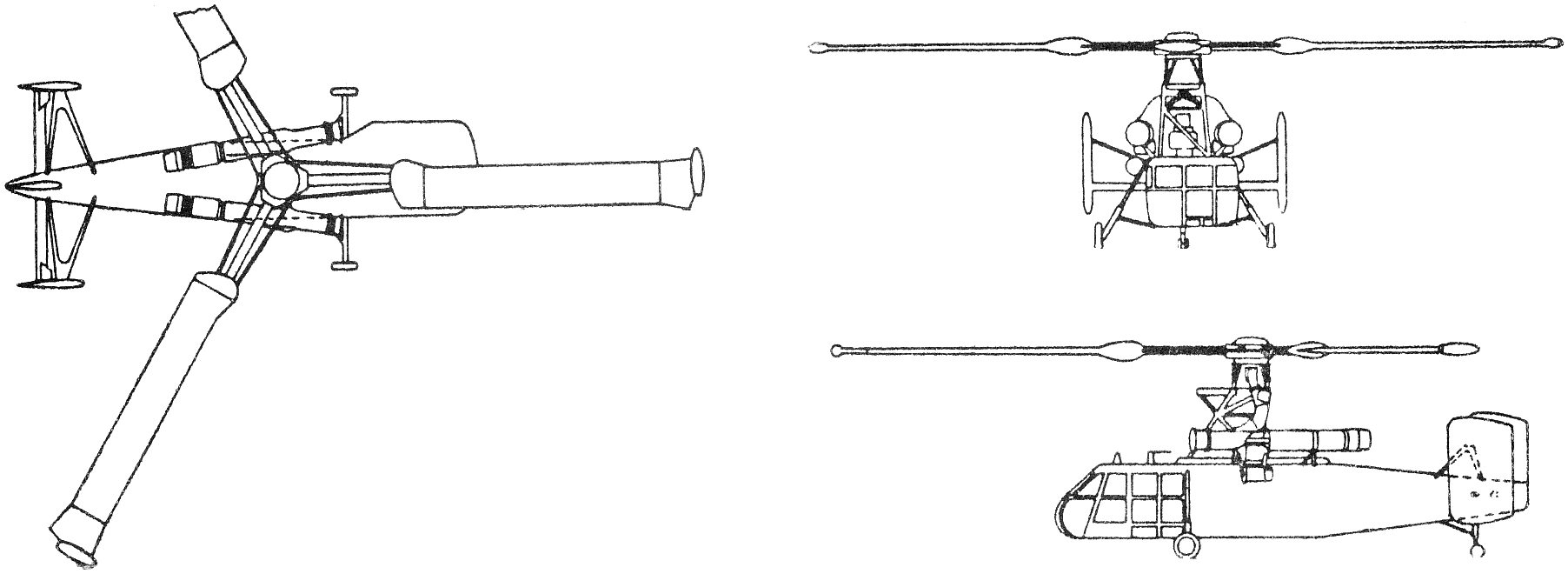
3-view line drawing of the McDonnell XHCH-1

Data from McDonnell Douglas aircraft since 1920. Volume II

General characteristics

- Crew: two
- Capacity: 30 troops or 24 stretchers
- Length: 37 ft 7 in (11.45 m)
- Height: 16 ft 8 in (5.07 m)
- Empty weight: 14,879 lb (6,749 kg)
- Gross weight: 35,331 lb (16,026 kg)
- Max takeoff weight: 42,000 lb (19,051 kg)
- Powerplant: 2 × Allison T56 gas turbine compressed air generator engines, 3,750 shp (2,800 kW) each
- Powerplant: 3 × McDonnell 12JP20 cold pressure jets, 1,600 lbf (7.1 kN) thrust each
- Main rotor diameter: 65 ft (20 m)
- Main rotor area: 3,320 sq ft (308 m^{2})

Performance

- Maximum speed: 115 mph (185 km/h, 100 kn) at sea level
- Combat range: 23 mi (37 km, 20 nmi)
- Service ceiling: 7,497 ft (2,285 m) hover ceiling out of ground effect
- Rate of climb: 3,100 ft/min (16 m/s)
