= Mitsubishi 1MF =

Japanese carrier-based fighter

1MF
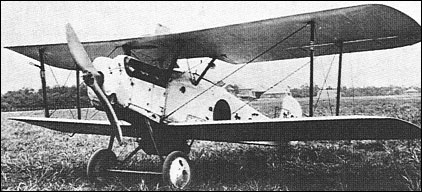

General information
- Type: Carrier Fighter
- Manufacturer: Mitsubishi Internal Combustion
- Designer: Herbert Smith
- Primary user: Imperial Japanese Navy
- Number built: 138

History
- Introduction date: 1923
- First flight: 1921
- Retired: 1930

The Mitsubishi 1MF was a Japanese carrier fighter aircraft of the 1920s. Designed for the Mitsubishi Aircraft Company by the British aircraft designer Herbert Smith, the 1MF, also known as the Navy Type 10 Carrier Fighter, was operated by the Imperial Japanese Navy from 1923 to 1930.

== Development and design ==
The Japanese shipbuilding company Mitsubishi Shipbuilding and Engineering Co Ltd set up a subsidiary company, the Mitsubishi Internal Combustion Engine Manufacturing Co Ltd (Mitsubishi Nainenki Seizo KK) in 1920 to produce aircraft and automobiles at Nagoya. It quickly gained a contract from the Imperial Japanese Navy to produce three types of aircraft for operation from aircraft carriers: a fighter, a torpedo bomber and a reconnaissance aircraft. To produce these aircraft, it hired Herbert Smith, formerly of the Sopwith Aviation Company to assist the design of these aircraft, Smith bringing to Japan Jack Hyland and a team of six other British engineers .

The fighter designed by Smith and his team, designated the 1MF by Mitsubishi, and known as the Navy Type 10 Carrier Fighter by the Japanese Navy (referring to the year of design of 1921, the 10th year of the Taishō period), first flew in October 1921.

The 1MF was a single-seat, single-bay biplane with unequal-span wings and all-wooden construction, powered by a 224 kW (300 hp) Hispano-Suiza 8 engine (license produced as the Mitsubishi Hi engine). It was fitted with claw-type arrestor gear for use with British-style fore and aft arrestor cables.

After successful flight testing, the aircraft was accepted by the Japanese Navy as a standard fighter, with 138 of various versions being built, production continuing until 1928.

== Operational history ==
The 1MF entered service with the Imperial Japanese Navy in 1923, replacing the Gloster Sparrowhawk. A 1MF aircraft became the first aircraft to take-off from and land on Japan's new aircraft carrier Hōshō on 28 February 1923. The 1MF series proved a tough and reliable aircraft, operating from the carriers Akagi and Kaga - as well as from Hōshō - when they entered service in 1927 and 1928 respectively. It continued in service until 1930, being replaced by the Nakajima A1N.

== Variants ==
1MF1
Initial prototype. Fitted with car-type radiator on front of nose. Navy designation Navy Type 10-1 Carrier Fighter.
1MF1A
Experimental version with increased wing area. Navy designation Navy Type 10-1 Carrier Fighter.
1MF2
Experimental prototype with two bay wing. Navy designation Navy Type 10-1 Carrier Fighter.
1MF3
Production version with Lamblin radiators under nose replacing original car-type radiators. Navy designation Navy Type 10-2 Carrier Fighter.
1MF4
Revised production version with cockpit moved forwards. Navy designation Navy Type 10-2 Carrier Fighter.
1MF5
Minor changes. Navy designation Navy Type 10-2 Carrier Fighter.
1MF5A
Carrier trainer version with jettisonable wheeled undercarriage and floats under wings to allow safe ditching. Navy designation Navy Type 10-2 Carrier Fighter.

== Operators ==
Japan

- Imperial Japanese Navy Air Service

== Specifications (1MF3) ==
Data from Japanese Aircraft 1910-1941

General characteristics

- Crew: 1
- Length: 6.9 m (22 ft 8 in)
- Wingspan: 8.5 m (27 ft 11 in)
- Height: 3.1 m (10 ft 2 in)
- Empty weight: 940 kg (2,072 lb)
- Gross weight: 1,280 kg (2,822 lb)
- Powerplant: 1 × Mitsubishi Hi V-8 water-cooled piston engine, 224 kW (300 hp)
- Propellers: 2-bladed fixed-pitch propeller

Performance

- Maximum speed: 213 km/h (132 mph, 115 kn)
- Endurance: 2½ hours
- Service ceiling: 7,000 m (23,000 ft)
- Time to altitude: 3,000 m (9,800 ft) in 10 minutes
- Power/mass: 0.18 kW/kg (0.11 hp/lb)

Armament

- Guns: 2 × 7.7 mm (.303 in) machine guns.

== See also ==
Related development

- Mitsubishi 2MR

Aircraft of comparable role, configuration, and era

- Fairey Flycatcher
