= Mitchell Kitalina =

American amphibious aircraft

Kitalina

General information
- Type: Seaplane
- National origin: United States
- Designer: Grover Mitchell

History
- Developed from: EDO 4000 series float

The Mitchell Kitalina is an American single place amphibious aircraft.

== Design and development ==
The Kitalina fuselage is built from an EDO 4000 float with a strut-braced high wing from a Luscombe. The engine is forward mounted on the high-wing with a T-tail arrangement.

== Specifications (Mitchell Kitalina) ==
Data from Sport Aviation

General characteristics

- Crew: 1
- Powerplant: 1 × Continental C85 fuel injected, horizontally opposed piston aircraft engine, 85 hp (63 kW)
- Propellers: 2-bladed

Performance

- Cruise speed: 78 kn (90 mph, 140 km/h)
