= Meger Heli-Star =

Heli-Star

General information
- Type: Homebuilt aircraft
- National origin: United States
- Designer: Mike Meger
- Number built: 1

History
- First flight: 25 March 1971

The Meger Heli-Star is a homebuilt helicopter developed in 1969.

== Design and development ==
The Heli-Star is a two place, three rotor helicopter with tricycle landing gear, using modified Enstrom F-28 helicopter rotor blades, gearbox and tail boom. The helicopter can be flown from either seat with dual controls. It was designed by Mike Meger, flight director of Enstrom. The fuselage splits open at the windshield line, sliding forward for access. The helicopter was demonstrated with the front section slid open in flight.

== Specifications (Meger Heli-Star) ==
Data from Air Progress, Flight Global

General characteristics

- Crew: 1
- Capacity: 1 passenger
- Length: 29 ft (8.8 m)
- Height: 8 ft 2 in (2.49 m)
- Empty weight: 1,450 lb (658 kg)
- Max takeoff weight: 2,100 lb (953 kg)
- Powerplant: 1 × Lycoming HIO-360-C1A , 205 hp (153 kW)
- Main rotor diameter: 3 × 29 ft 6 in (8.99 m)

Performance

- Maximum speed: 100 kn (120 mph, 190 km/h)
- Cruise speed: 78 kn (90 mph, 144 km/h)
- Service ceiling: 13,000 ft (4,000 m)
- Rate of climb: 1,000 ft/min (5.1 m/s)
- Disk loading: 2.1 lb/sq ft (10 kg/m^{2})

== See also ==
Related development

- Enstrom F-28
