= MDG Midgy-Club =

French cabin biplane

Midgy-Club
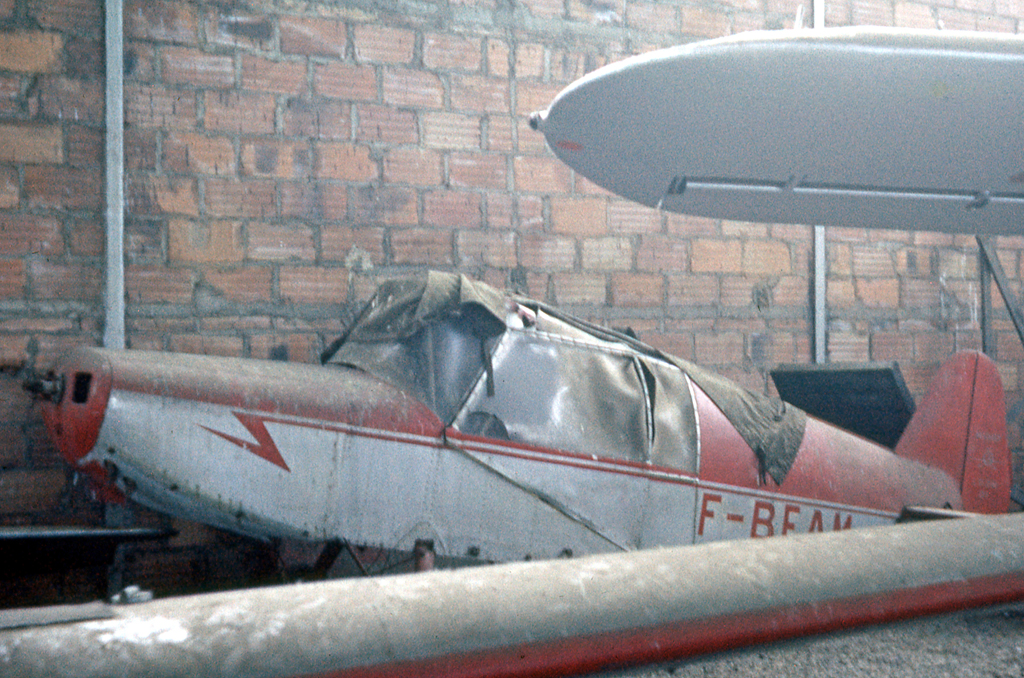
- LD-261 Midgy-Club stored at Toussus airfield near Paris in 1963

General information
- Type: Cabin biplane
- National origin: France
- Manufacturer: Instruments de Precision M.D.G
- Primary user: Private pilot owners

History
- First flight: 1946

The MDG Midgy-Club was a post-war cabin biplane designed and built by Instruments de Precision M.D.G at Garches, France. The company designed and built precision instruments and due to the close relationship with the aviation industry, the company designed and built two aircraft. The first, MDG LD.45, was a single-seat biplane. The MDG LD-261 Midgy-Club was a follow-on design with an enclosed cabin with two seats arranged in tandem layout. It was built in small numbers.

== Specifications ==
Data from Jane's All the World's Aircraft 1951–52

General characteristics

- Crew: 1
- Capacity: 1 passenger
- Length: 5.45 m (17 ft 11 in)
- Wingspan: 7.00 m (23 ft 0 in)
- Height: 1.95 m (6 ft 5 in)
- Wing area: 10.6 m^{2} (114 sq ft)
- Aspect ratio: 9.15:1
- Empty weight: 320 kg (705 lb)
- Gross weight: 541 kg (1,193 lb)
- Fuel capacity: 60 L (13 imp gal; 16 US gal)
- Powerplant: 1 × Continental A65 air-cooled flat-four, 48 kW (65 hp)

Performance

- Maximum speed: 180 km/h (110 mph, 97 kn)
- Cruise speed: 158 km/h (98 mph, 85 kn)
- Service ceiling: 6,800 m (22,300 ft) (absolute ceiling)
- Rate of climb: 2.8 m/s (560 ft/min)
