= Mitsubishi RP-1 =

1994 Japanese experimental helicopter

RP-1

General information
- Type: Experimental twin-engined helicopter
- National origin: Japan
- Manufacturer: Mitsubishi Heavy Industries
- Number built: 1

History
- First flight: 14 September 1994
- Developed from: Sikorsky S-76
- Developed into: Mitsubishi MH2000

The Mitsubishi RP-1 is an experimental, Japanese twin-engined helicopter developed as part of a secret company research programme. The RP-1 was first revealed in April 1994 just before it started hover trials, leading to a first flight on 14 September 1994.

== Specifications ==
Data from Jane's All the World's Aircraft 1994-95

General characteristics

- Length: 15.00 m (49 ft 2.5 in)
- Height: 4.30 m (14 ft 1.25 in)
- Powerplant: 2 × Mitsubishi MG-5 Turboshaft , 447 kW (600 hp) each

=== Bibliography ===
- Lambert, Mark, ed. (1994). Jane's All the World's Aircraft 1994-95. Coulsdon, Surrey, United Kingdom: Jane's Information Group. ISBN 0-7106-1160-9.
