= McMullen Mac Airliner =

Mac Airliner
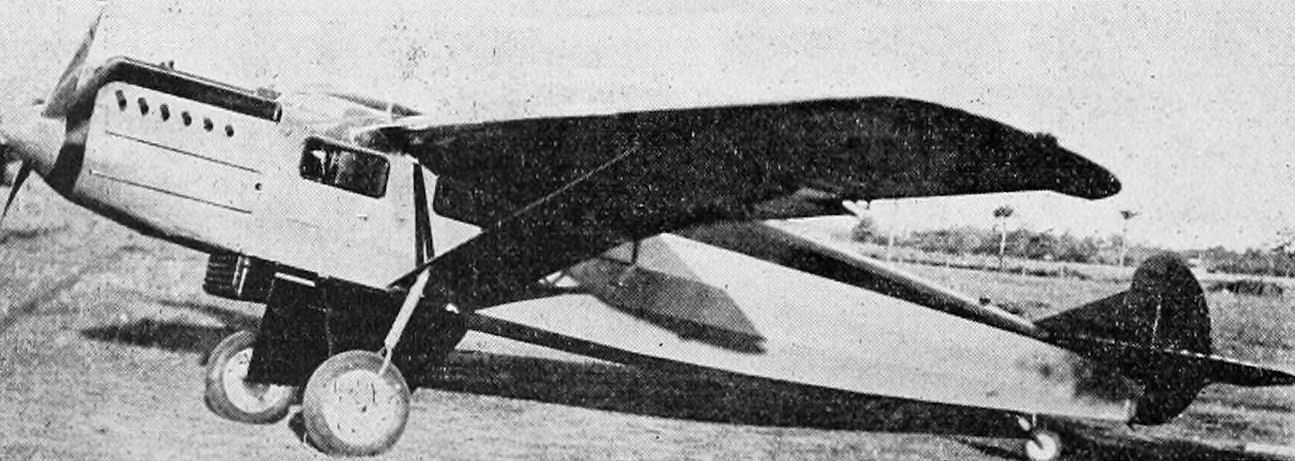

General information
- Type: seven passenger airliner
- National origin: United States
- Manufacturer: McMullen Aircraft Co.
- Number built: one

History
- First flight: Early 1929
- Retired: Destroyed in hangar fire 12 December 1929

The McMullen Mac Airliner was a late 1920s American light airliner powered by a Liberty L-12 V-12 engine of World War I origin. The sole prototype was destroyed in a hangar fire.

== Design and development ==
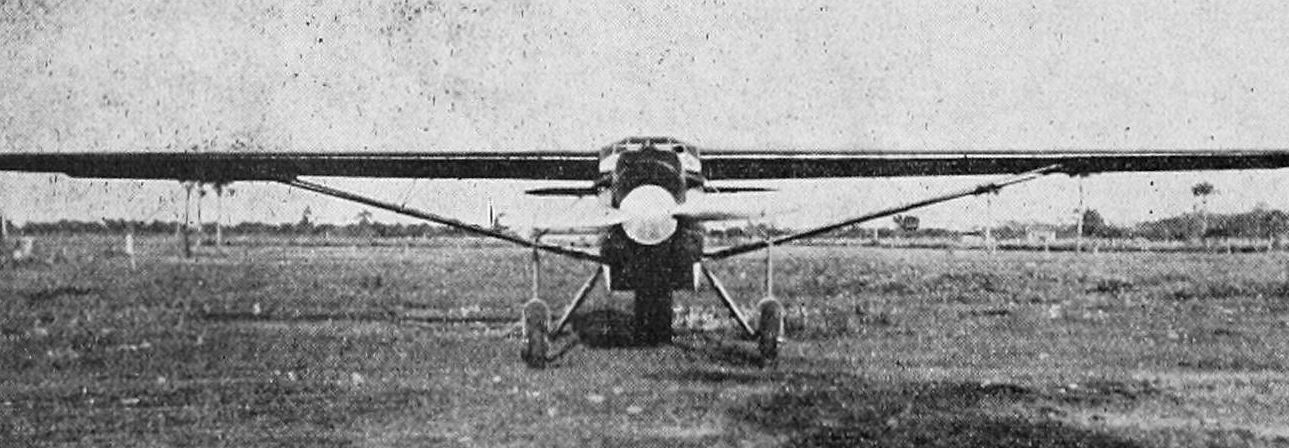

The Mac Airliner was designed as a fast carrier of mail and passengers, its cost lowered by the use of the old but readily available Liberty L-12 engine, produced in large numbers late in World War I. It was a shoulder wing, strut braced monoplane based on steel tube structures.

Its wings used a M-6 airfoil combining high lift and low drag. They were braced from the lower fuselage by pairs of parallel struts to the wing-spars at about 60% span, encased in airfoil section fairings and adding to the wings' lift. Its ailerons were beyond the bracing struts.

The Mac's upright Liberty engine was nose-mounted with its radiator below it. From nose to tail the fuselage was flat-sided apart from rounded decking. The pilot's enclosed cabin was at the leading edge with windowed access doors below. Separate rectangular windows under the wing lit the passengers' cabin. The fuselage tapered to the rear, where the tailplane was mounted on top and braced to a cropped triangular fin that carried a rounded balanced rudder.

The Mac had conventional, fixed landing gear, with separate, cranked axles from the lower fuselage providing a track of 8 ft 9 in (2.67 m). Its oleo strut legs were mounted on the forward wing struts at points strengthened by struts to the upper fuselage. Its tail wheel was hydraulically damped.

The date of the Mac's first flight is not known but by mid-April 1929 it was being prepared for a flight to an airshow in Chicago. The sole example was destroyed in a hangar fire at Tampa on 12 December 1929.

== Specifications ==
Data from Aero Digest, August 1929

General characteristics

- Crew: one
- Capacity: seven passengers
- Length: 38 ft 3 in (11.66 m)
- Wingspan: 54 ft 6 in (16.61 m)
- Height: 9 ft 6 in (2.90 m)
- Wing area: 328 sq ft (30.5 m^{2})
- Airfoil: M-6
- Empty weight: 3,000 lb (1,361 kg)
- Gross weight: 5,500 lb (2,495 kg)
- Payload: 1,330 lb (600 kg)
- Fuel capacity: 160 US gal (130 imp gal; 610 L)
- Powerplant: 1 × Liberty L-12 water-cooled V-12, 410 hp (310 kW) at 1,700 rpm
- Propellers: 2-bladed metal Hamilton Standard

Performance

- Maximum speed: 145 mph (233 km/h, 126 kn)
- Cruise speed: 120 mph (190 km/h, 100 kn)
- Stall speed: 60 mph (97 km/h, 52 kn)
- Landing speed: 55 mph (89 km/h; 48 kn)
- Range: 750 mi (1,210 km, 650 nmi)
- Service ceiling: 15,000 ft (4,600 m)
- Rate of climb: 1,250 ft/min (6.4 m/s) from sea level
