= Medwecki M9 =

General information
- Type: Two seat training and touring aircraft
- National origin: Poland
- Designer: Józef Medwecki and Władysław Kiryluk
- Number built: 1

History
- First flight: early August 1939

The Medwecki M9 was a 1930s, Polish designed two-seat cabin tourer or trainer aircraft. Only one was completed before the outbreak of World War II.

== Design and development ==
Though Józef Medwecki and Władysław Kiryluk were employed by P.W.S, they designed and built the Medwecki M9 in their own time. Begun in 1937, it was a product of the 1930s revival of amateur aircraft design in Poland and perhaps the last to fly before the German invasion of Poland in September 1939. With funding from LOPP and some aircraft companies, Medwecki, Kiryluk and friends built the M9 in the P.W.S. workshops.

The M9 was of mixed construction. Its constant thickness high wing had a rectangular plan apart from blunted tips. The wing was a wooden structure in two parts, had two spars and was plywood-covered ahead of the forward spar with fabric covering elsewhere. A pair of parallel steel tube struts on each side braced the wing to the lower fuselage. Its ailerons were of the Frise type.

It was powered by a 63 kW (85 hp) Cirrus III upright 4-cylinder air-cooled inline engine with its fuel tanks in the wings. The M9's fuselage was built around a triangular section frame of steel tubes, the nose metal covered and the rest with fabric covering over a light wooden frame giving it an oval section. Its enclosed cabin was under the wing, with its windscreen just ahead of the leading edge. There were two seats in tandem, each with a starboard-side door and dual controls, and a luggage compartment behind the cabin.

The horizontal tail of the M9, mounted on top of the fuselage, was straight-tapered with rounded tips and the fin was also straight-tapered. It carried a full, rounded rudder which reached down to the keel through a gap between the elevators. The cantilever empennage had a wooden structure with plywood covered fixed surfaces and fabric covered control surfaces.

The M9 had fixed, tailskid landing gear with tall, streamlined cantilever legs containing compressed-rubber shock absorbers and mounting wheels enclosed within spats.

It was flown for the first time by Stefan Hanschild in early August 1939. Tests showed the M9 had excellent and docile handling characteristics suiting it to both touring and training roles. The Silesian Aeroclub offered to buy the prototype when its tests were complete and plans were made for production of M9s with a range of more powerful engines and a wing set with light dihedral but these hopes were overtaken by the German invasion.

== Specifications ==
Data from J. Cynk, 1970. Performance figures are estimates.

General characteristics

- Length: 7.1 m (23 ft 4 in)
- Wingspan: 10 m (32 ft 10 in)
- Height: 2.2 m (7 ft 3 in)
- Wing area: 16.5 m^{2} (178 sq ft)
- Airfoil: Bobek-Zdaniewski
- Empty weight: 425 kg (937 lb)
- Gross weight: 650 kg (1,433 lb)
- Powerplant: 1 × Cirrus III upright 4-cylinder air-cooled inline, 63 kW (85 hp)
- Propellers: 2-bladed Szomański, wooden

Performance

- Maximum speed: 180 km/h (110 mph, 97 kn) at sea level
- Cruise speed: 140 km/h (87 mph, 76 kn)
- Stall speed: 70 km/h (43 mph, 38 kn) minimum speed
- Range: 700 km (430 mi, 380 nmi)
