= Miller WM-2 =

Single-seat sport aircraft designed in the US in the early 1970s

WM-2
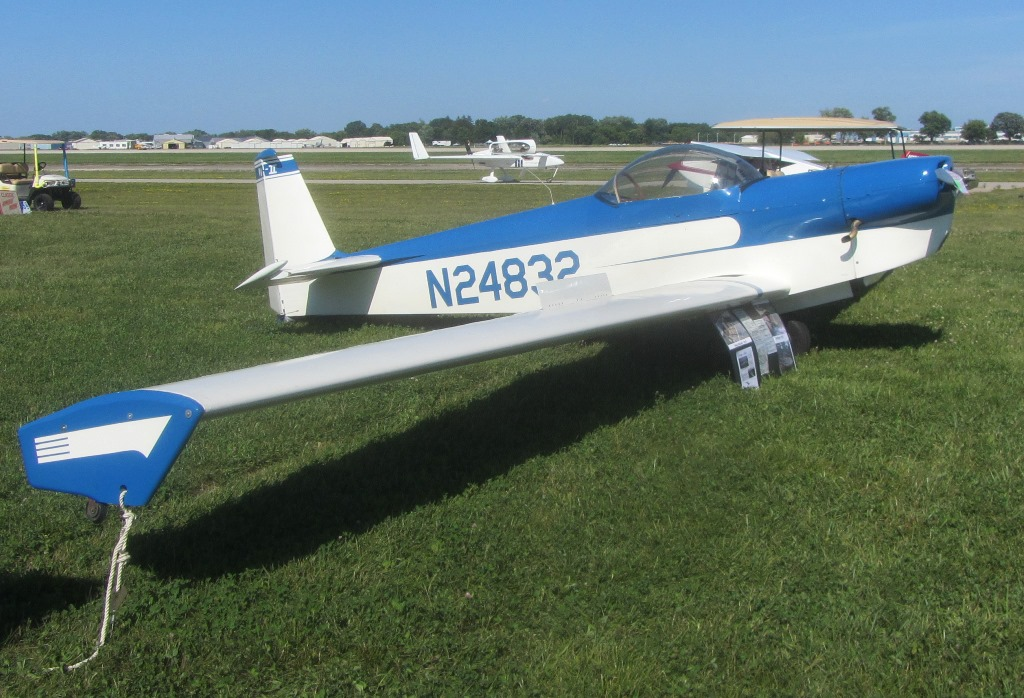
- WM-2

General information
- Type: Sport aircraft
- National origin: United States
- Manufacturer: Homebuilt
- Designer: William Terry Miller

History
- First flight: August 1972

The Miller WM-2 was a single-seat sport aircraft designed in the United States in the early 1970s and marketed for home building.

== Design ==
Although primarily a powered aircraft, the WM-2's high aspect-ratio wings enabled the pilot to stop the engine and soar on thermals as with a sailplane (designer W. Terry Miller's previous projects had been sailplanes).

It was a generally conventional, low-wing cantilever monoplane with a cockpit enclosed by a bubble canopy. The undercarriage, however, was a manually retractable monowheel with a tailskid behind it.

The fuselage was of wooden construction, covered in plywood and fibreglass, while the wings and tail were built of wood and covered in fabric.

== Specifications (prototype) ==
Data from Jane's All the World's Aircraft 1977–78, 548

General characteristics

- Crew: One pilot
- Length: 20 ft 0 in (6.10 m)
- Wingspan: 40 ft 0 in (12.19 m)
- Height: 5 ft 3 in (1.60 m)
- Aspect ratio: 11.1
- Airfoil: Modified NACA laminar-flow sections
- Empty weight: 775 lb (351 kg)
- Gross weight: 1,050 lb (476 kg)
- Powerplant: 1 × Continental A65 , 65 hp (49 kW)

Performance

- Maximum speed: 136 mph (219 km/h, 118 kn)
- Cruise speed: 120 mph (192 km/h, 100 kn)
- Range: 336 mi (540 km, 292 nmi)
- Service ceiling: 24,000 ft (7,300 m)
- Maximum glide ratio: 15
- Rate of climb: 890 ft/min (4.5 m/s)
