= McDonnell XH-20 Little Henry =

1940s American experimental helicopter

XH-20 Little Henry
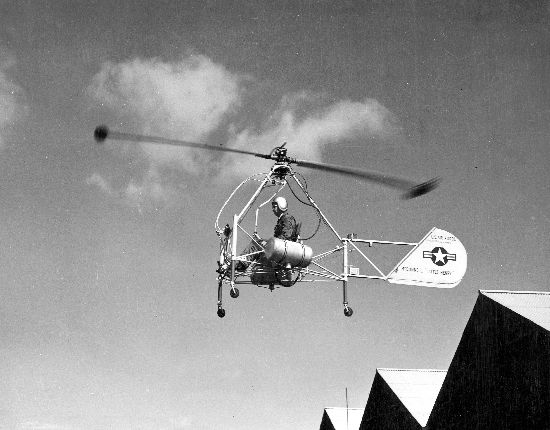

General information
- Type: Experimental ramjet-rotor powered helicopter
- National origin: United States
- Manufacturer: McDonnell Aircraft
- Primary user: United States Air Force
- Number built: 2

History
- First flight: 29 August 1947

The McDonnell XH-20 Little Henry is a 1940s American experimental lightweight helicopter designed and built by McDonnell Aircraft.

== Development ==
The McDonnell Model 38 was a lightweight experimental helicopter sponsored by the United States Army Air Force to test the concept of using small ramjets at the tips of the rotor blades. As a functional helicopter it was a simple open-frame steel-tube construction. Allotted the military designation XH-20 the first of two first flew on the 29 August 1947.

Although the XH-20 flew successfully the ramjets were noisy and burnt a large amount of fuel and plans to build a larger two-seat XH-29 were abandoned.

== Variants ==
Data from: U.S.Military Aircraft Designations and Serials since 1909

Model 38 XH-20 Little Henry
experimental lightweight helicopter, two built.
Model 79 XH-29 Big Henry
proposed two-seat ramjet-powered development, canceled.

== Operator ==
United States

- United States Air Force

== Aircraft on display ==
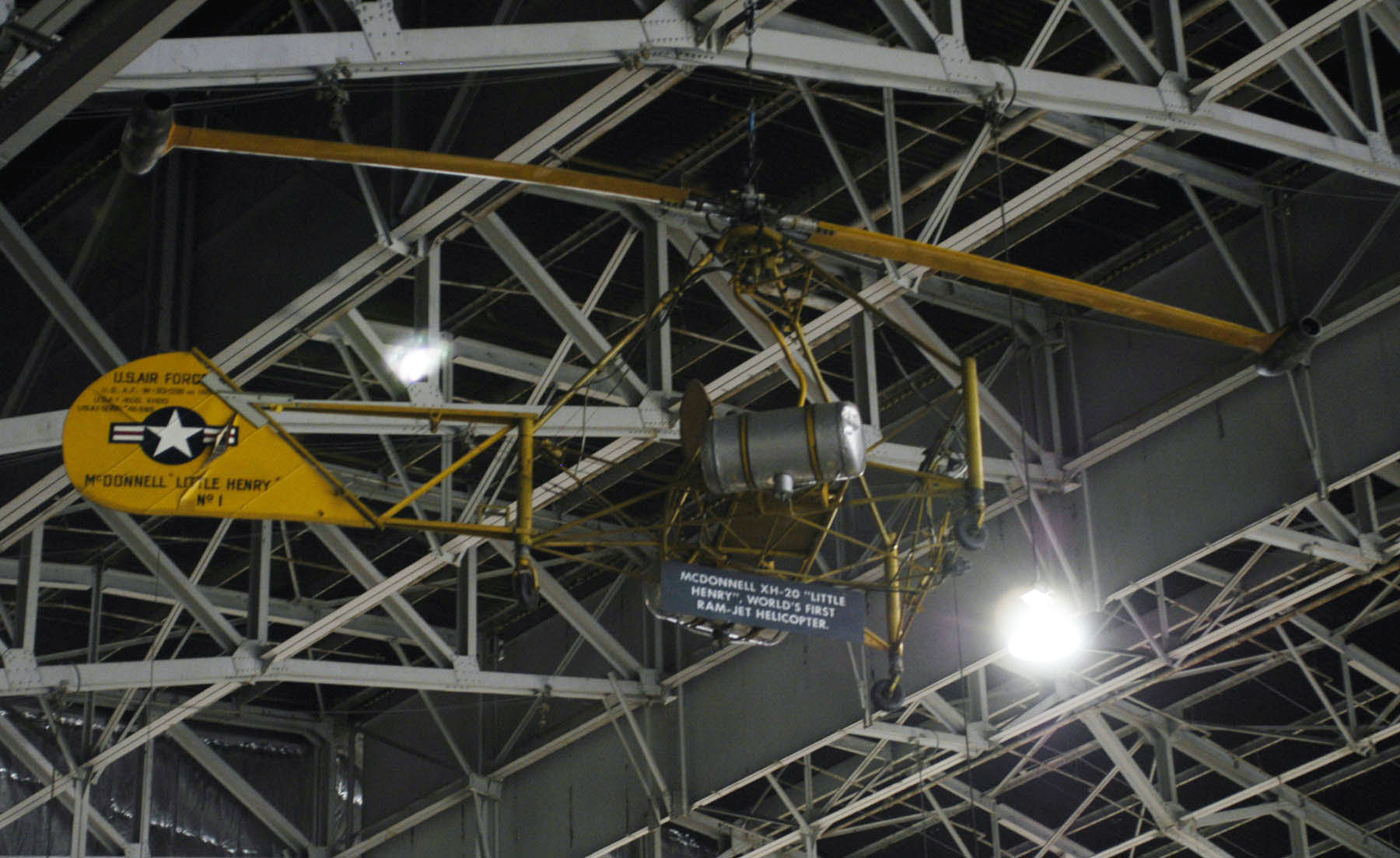
XH-20 at the NMUSAF

- 46-689 the first XH-20 is on display at the National Museum of the United States Air Force

== Specifications ==
Data from

General characteristics

- Crew: 1
- Length: 12 ft 6 in (3.81 m)
- Height: 6 ft 8 in (2.03 m)
- Empty weight: 290 lb (132 kg)
- Powerplant: 2 × McDonnell Ramjets
- Main rotor diameter: 20 ft (6.1 m)

Performance

- Maximum speed: 50 mph (80 km/h, 43 kn)

== See also ==
Aircraft of comparable role, configuration, and era

- Fairey Ultra-light Helicopter
- Hiller YH-32 Hornet
- Sud-Ouest Djinn

Related lists

- List of military aircraft of the United States
- List of single seat helicopters
