= Mitsubishi 2MR8 =

Japanese reconnaissance aircraft

Type 92 Reconnaissance Aircraft
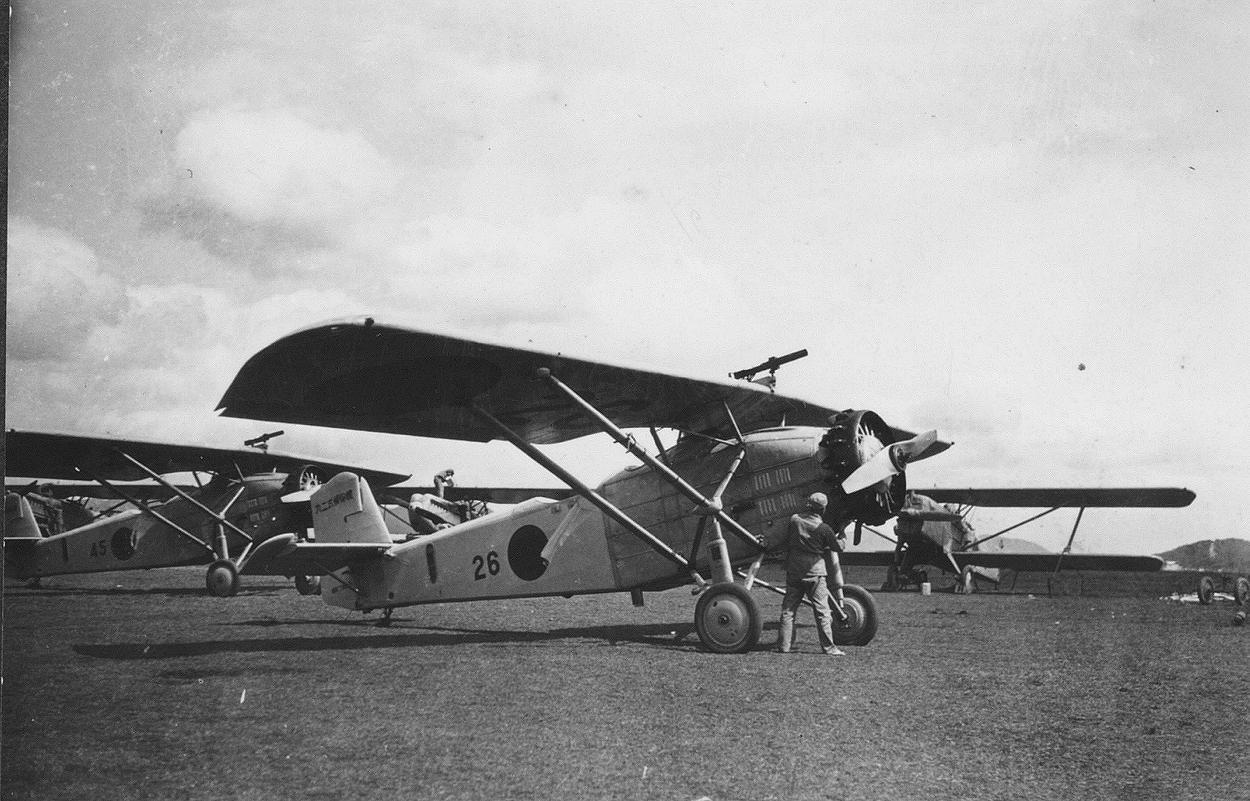

General information
- Type: Reconnaissance aircraft
- Manufacturer: Mitsubishi
- Primary user: Imperial Japanese Army Air Force
- Number built: 234 (4 prototypes + 230 production aircraft)

History
- First flight: 28 March 1931

The Mitsubishi Army Type 92 Reconnaissance Aircraft (九二式偵察機) (company designation 2MR8) was a Japanese short-range reconnaissance aircraft of the 1930s designed by Mitsubishi for the Imperial Japanese Army Air Force. A total of 230 were built, serving between 1933 and 1936. A parasol monoplane, the Type 92 was the first military aircraft powered by an engine both designed and manufactured in Japan to enter service.

== Development and design ==
In 1930, Mitsubishi developed two designs to meet a Japanese Army requirement for a short-range reconnaissance aircraft to supplement the larger, long-range Kawasaki Type 88, the 2MR7, a biplane based on its earlier 2MR reconnaissance aircraft and B2M torpedo bomber developed for the Imperial Japanese Navy, and the 2MR8, a high-wing parasol monoplane.

The first of four prototypes flew on 28 March 1931, powered by a 239 kW (320 hp) Mitsubishi A2 radial engine. Successive prototypes were modified with more powerful engines, reduced wing area and a shorter fuselage until the fourth prototype was accepted by the Japanese Army, and ordered into service as the Type 92 Reconnaissance Aircraft.

The production Type 92 had fixed wide-track divided landing gear, and was powered by a 354 kW (450 hp) Mitsubishi Type 92 radial engine. It carried a crew of two in open cockpits, with an armament of two synchronised, forward-firing 7.7 mm (.303 in) machine guns and one or two flexibly-mounted guns on the observer's cockpit. Production completed in 1934 after a total of 230 aircraft were built.

To meet the requirements of the Japanese Ministry of Railways for a survey aircraft, Mitsubishi developed a civilian version of the Type 92, the Hato survey aircraft. A single aircraft was ordered in 1935, together with a Fokker Super Universal built by Nakajima. Powered by a 298 kW (400 hp) Mitsubishi A5 engine, it differed from the military version in having a glazed canopy over the rear cockpit (which accommodated a crew of two), an open forward pilot's cockpit, and spat-type main wheel fairings. It was delivered in March 1936 and registered J-AARA.

== Operational history ==
The Type 92 saw active service in Manchuria with the air battalions (later expanded to air wings) of the Kwantung Army Air Corps between 1933 and 1936. The Mitsubishi Type 92 was also used by the Chinese Air Force in the early stages of the Second Sino-Japanese War.

== Operators ==
China

- Kwangsi Air Force purchased two Type 92s in September 1934, with a few more being purchased in 1935.

Japan

- Imperial Japanese Army Air Force

== Specifications ==
Data from Japanese Aircraft, 1910-1941

General characteristics

- Crew: 2
- Length: 8.52 m (27 ft 11 in)
- Wingspan: 12.75 m (41 ft 10 in)
- Height: 3.48 m (11 ft 5 in)
- Wing area: 26 m^{2} (280 sq ft)
- Empty weight: 1,060 kg (2,337 lb)
- Gross weight: 1,770 kg (3,902 lb)
- Powerplant: 1 × Mitsubishi Army Type 92 400hp Air Cooled Radial 9-cylinder air-cooled radial piston engine, 298–354 kW (400–475 hp) (company designation A5)
- Propellers: 2-bladed Reed-type fixed-pitch metal propeller

Performance

- Maximum speed: 220 km/h (140 mph, 120 kn)
- Endurance: 4-5 hours
- Service ceiling: 5,700 m (18,700 ft)
- Time to altitude: 3,000 m (9,800 ft) in 10 minutes 30 seconds
- Wing loading: 68.1 kg/m^{2} (13.9 lb/sq ft)
- Power/mass: 0.24 kW/kg (0.15 hp/lb)

Armament

- Guns: 2 × fixed forward firing 7.7 mm (0.303 in) machine guns, 2 × flexibly mounted 7.7 mm (0.303 in) machine guns in rear cockpit
