= Brabazon Committee =

1942 UK government committee on the post-war civilian airliner market

The Brabazon Committee was a committee set up by the British government in 1942 to investigate the future needs of the British Empire's civilian airliner market following World War II. The study was an attempt at defining, in broad overview, the impact of projected advances in aviation technology and to forecast the global needs of the post war British Empire (in South Asia, Africa, the Near and Far East) and Commonwealth (Australia, Canada, New Zealand) in the area of air transport, for passengers, mail, and cargo.

The study recognized that the British Empire and Commonwealth as both a political and economic entity would have a vital need for aviation systems (principally aircraft) to facilitate its continued existence and self-reliance in the post-war world. For military and commercial reasons, the empire simply could not continue to exist if did not understand the needs, and develop the industrial infrastructure to provide, the aviation systems and sub-systems necessary to supply and maintain a global air transport service.

== Background ==
Soon after the start of World War II, with no recorded discussion in government, a decision was taken to concentrate all efforts of the British aircraft industry on combat aircraft, and two embryo airliner projects, the Fairey FC1 and the Short S.32, were both cancelled. Subsequently, Britain had to purchase three Boeing 314 flying boats for BOAC to operate an air service between the US and the UK. It has been suggested that there was then some agreement with the United States that the US would concentrate on transport aircraft while the UK would concentrate on their heavy bombers. However, Peter Masefield was certain that such a policy was never even suggested, far less implemented. On the contrary, the action was simply to do nothing: no orders were ever placed for new British transport aircraft. It was stated in Parliament in December 1942 that "the work of aircraft designers must, at the present stage of the war, be devoted wholly to war requirements". The UK was simply too busy producing military aircraft to find the capacity to build transports, and the materials required were in any case in very short supply.

When Winston Churchill attended the 1942 Moscow Conference, travelling in the freezing bomb bay of a Consolidated Liberator bomber, it brought home to him the absence of modern British airliners and the need for action with regard to transport aircraft. After discussion with Sir Stafford Cripps, the Minister of Aircraft Production, and his predecessor Lord Brabazon, he recognized that as a result of that neglect the United Kingdom was to be left at the close of the war with little experience in the design, manufacture and final assembly of transport aircraft, and no infrastructure or trained personnel for the doing of same. Yet, the massive infrastructure created in the US would allow them to produce civilian aircraft based upon military transport designs; and crucially these would have to be purchased by the UK, Empire and Commonwealth to meet their post-war civilian transport aviation needs.

In consequence, Churchill asked Lord Brabazon to form a Committee to investigate the issue and make suitable recommendations. Following this the Cabinet authorized a Second Committee to undertake more detailed work and prepare a list of requirements for each type to provide a basis for design and development.

On 24 Dec 1942, a two-part article in Flight concluded "The whole British Empire at the present time has an operational fleet of transport aircraft, comprising conversions, makeshifts and cast-offs, totally inadequate to represent the Empire in serving the air routes of the world in the peace to come. Have we to rely upon other nations to do it for us? The British aircraft industry is equal to the task. The Government should decide this vital question at once."

== First Committee and Interim Report ==
The first Committee under the leadership of Lord Brabazon first met on 23 December 1942 and met a further nine times between then and 9 February 1943, when it submitted its outline recommendations to the UK Cabinet in its Interim Report. This recommended the adaptation for civil use of four military types of aircraft which were then in, or near, production, and the design of five new types specifically for civil use.

The four adaptations were:

- (i) Avro York (developed from the Avro Lancaster)
- (ii) Vickers Warwick
- (iii) Short Hythe (converted from the Short Sunderland III)
- (iv) Short Sandringham (an improved conversion of the Short Sunderland V)

The five new types proposed were:

- Type I: a very large, long-range landplane for the North Atlantic route.
- Type II: an economical replacement for the Douglas DC-3 for European services.
- Type III: a four-engined, medium-range landplane for the Empire routes.
- Type IV: the most advanced of them all, a jet-propelled mailplane for the North Atlantic.
- Type V: a twin-engined, fourteen-passenger feederliner.

== Second Committee and Final Report ==
Some weeks after the report from the First Committee, it was decided to form a Second Committee with more comprehensive and detailed terms of reference. The Second Committee began meeting on 25 May 1943 under the leadership of Lord Brabazon in order to investigate the future needs of the British civilian airliner market. The committee included members of the state-owned airlines British Overseas Airways Corporation (BOAC) and later British European Airways (BEA), and the Secretary was Peter Masefield who later became the Chief Executive of BEA. They studied a number of designs and technical considerations, meeting frequently over the next two years to further clarify the needs of different market segments, and producing 151 papers. The government contact for this committee was Sir Stafford Cripps, the Minister of Aircraft Production until May 1945 when he was succeeded by Ernest Brown.

The views of the Committee changed considerably in that period and the list of Brabazon Types continued to vary, as did the specifications of each. One early recommendation was to pursue the "Interim Types" which were conversions and/or developments of wartime aircraft. The original four adaptations became:

- (i) Avro York (developed from the Avro Lancaster)
- (ii) Avro Tudor (developed from the Avro Lincoln, itself a development of the Lancaster), the Tudor I being an interim transatlantic airliner pending the introduction of the Brabazon Type I, and the Tudor II being an interim Brabazon Type III airliner with shorter range and greater capacity for the British Empire routes.
- (iii) Handley Page Hermes, a civil development of the Halifax, first flown in 1945 but did not enter limited service with BOAC until 1950, having evolved through several iterations to be the Hermes IV.
- (iv) Short Sandringham (an improved conversion of the Short Sunderland Mark V)

These were all produced in some numbers in due course, although the Tudor I and Tudor II never entered service. They were all too late to compete (for example) with the earlier and much more capable Douglas DC-4 which had been in service since 1942 and could carry more passengers further and faster. The final report in December 1945 ignored all these interim types and called for the construction of seven new designs which would be required after the war:

- Type I was for a very large transatlantic airliner serving the high-volume routes like London-New York, seating its passengers in luxury for the 12-hour trip. The Type I design developed into Air Ministry Specification 2/44.
- Type IIA, originally a short-haul feederliner intended to replace the Douglas DC-3, was for a piston-powered aircraft, to Air Ministry Specification 25/43, as originally intended.
- Type IIB was for an aircraft using the new turboprop engine, to Air Ministry Specification 8/46. This came about because Vickers favoured the move to turboprop power. There was some scepticism on the part of the committee, and in the end they decided to divide the specification in two, allowing the turboprop design to go ahead as Type IIB while at the same time ordering a "backup" piston design as the Type IIA. A parallel alternative specification 16/46 was subsequently raised to cover later changes.
- Type III called for a larger four-engined, medium-range aircraft, to Air Ministry Specification 6/45, for various multi-hop routes serving the British Empire, the "Medium Range Empire" (MRE) routes. This was at one time two separate requirements, IIIA and IIIB, but these had merged again in the Final Report.
- Type IV was a jet-powered, 100-seat high-speed transport, to Air Ministry Specification 22/46. This was added at the personal urging of one of the committee members, Geoffrey de Havilland, whose company was involved in development of both Britain's first jet fighters and jet engines. The Type IV could, if the whole concept of a jet airliner could be made to work, be able to replace the Type III outright and assume many of the duties of the other planes in shorter routes.
- Type VA (initially Type V) was effectively the original Type II fourteen-passenger, feederliner aircraft to Air Ministry Specification 18/44 after the Type II had evolved into larger designs.
- Type VB was an eight-seat aircraft as a de Havilland Dragon Rapide replacement, to Air Ministry Specification 26/43, added as a further split in the Type V requirement.

The normal method for government aircraft production was that an Air Ministry Specification was issued and aircraft companies tendered designs to meet the specification. It was customary then to order prototypes of one or two designs for evaluation (though at times aircraft were ordered "off the drawing board" (Note: eg the Armstrong Whitworth Albemarle ordered without waiting to assess prototypes (Buttler p75))). In some cases manufacturers brought designs to the Air Ministry and a specification was written for the design. (Note: eg the de Havilland Mosquito which came from discussions between de Havilland and Air Ministry resulting in writing of specification B.1/40 after placing an order for 50.(Buttler p79)) This process did not allow for companies to propose solutions which were, in their view, better, neither did it necessarily reflect the requirements of the planned operator who may have wanted something different. Additionally, other government bodies such as the Royal Aircraft Establishment had input to the process and these often conflicted with the designers being given contradictory instructions. One example of this is the trouble that Miles Aircraft had with the Ministry of Aircraft Production in relation to the design of the Miles Marathon. In 1944, the Ministry of Aircraft Production started the process for contracts for all of these planes with individual companies; this role was taken over by the newly created Ministry of Supply in 1945. The view of Sir Cyril Musgrave, the Permanent Under-Secretary in the Ministry of Supply, was that "Only I can order civil airliners!" This attitude was a source of considerable difficulties in this process.

== The aircraft ==
- The Type I design was awarded directly to the Bristol Aeroplane Company for the Bristol Brabazon, based on submissions they had made during the war for a "100 ton bomber" and judging that they had the capacity. However, Miles Aircraft proposed the Miles X-11, part of the ongoing Miles M.26 development programme, but this innovative design was not seriously considered by the Ministry. One Brabazon was built and flown in 1949 with Bristol Centaurus radial engines but a planned Brabazon II with Bristol Proteus turboprop engines was not completed; the project folded in 1951 when, with BOAC having lost interest, issues with the first aircraft showed that a wing re-design was required for the Proteus.
- The Type IIA requirement was met by the Centaurus-powered Airspeed Ambassador, and 20 were ordered for BEA. The first prototype flew in July 1947, and the type entered service with BEA in March 1952. Airspeed were by then wholly owned by de Havilland, who had no interest in developing the design further, although a Dart-powered version had been proposed.
- The Type IIB requirements were initially met by the Vickers VC.2 Viceroy, and the Armstrong Whitworth A.W.55 Apollo. The Type IIB requirement was developed as the Vickers Viscount, with the Apollo failing to successfully compete with the Viscount. The production Viscount was significantly larger than the Type II proposal as BEA wanted a larger and much more capable aircraft and the Rolls-Royce Dart engines were being developed to produce much more power than expected. Consequently the updated Specification 21/49 was issued to represent the production Viscount which was ordered by BEA in 1950. Ultimately 445 Viscounts were built.
- The Type III called for a larger four-engined, medium-range aircraft for various multi-hop MRE routes serving the British Empire. This was intended initially to be the Avro 690 Type XXII with six Rolls-Royce Merlin engines which went through many specification changes and design evolutions to be the Avro 693 with four Rolls-Royce Avon jets. BOAC cancelled their order in April 1947 and the project was cancelled in July 1947. A new Specification 2/47 was issued for the MRE and this was developed as the Bristol Britannia. Unfortunately, this also suffered delays in development and did not enter service with BOAC until February 1957, despite having been ordered in November 1949.
- The Type IV became the world's first jet airliner, the de Havilland Comet, the first prototype flying in July 1949. Initially successful, it suffered from well-publicized structural problems and failed to sell in great numbers.
- The Type VA requirement was developed as the Miles Marathon, first flying in May 1946. Following the collapse of Miles Aircraft, 40 were built by Handley Page for BEA who refused to take delivery, reducing their order for 30 by stages before eventually cancelling completely in 1952. The remainder were sold to airlines while the Royal Air Force were made to take 30 as navigation trainers.
- The Type VB requirement was met by the de Havilland Dove which had been commenced as a private venture in 1943. The prototype first flew in September 1945 and it continued in production until 1967, with production of 544. A larger version, the Heron, was developed and 149 were built between 1950 and 1967.

== Other aircraft ==
Other aircraft were built as interim Brabazon types, plus some which were strictly not Brabazon types, but are often referred to as such. In some cases the Ministry would adopt a design by writing a specification for it. Some were built to the Brabazon specification in the hope of getting Ministry approval and finance, some were built totally as private ventures and others were contracted by the Ministry without reference to the Committee. The principal aircraft of note were:

- The Saunders-Roe SR.45 Princess was not a Brabazon Committee recommendation as a Type I aircraft but was direct submission from the company which gained Ministry funding. At the time, BOAC still considered that there was a future for luxury travel by flying boat. Three aircraft were built but BOAC ceased flying boat operations in November 1950 before the first flight in August 1952. No use was found for the three aircraft but they were not scrapped until 1967.
- The Vickers VC.1 Viking was a private venture by Vickers of a new stressed-skin fuselage with wing of their Wellington bomber to speed development. It was notionally a Type IIA aircraft for short haul European routes. It achieved good success in its forms as the Viking, Varsity trainer and Valetta transport with 588 aircraft made, principally for the Royal Air Force.
- The Bristol 170 Freighter was a 1944 private venture for which the Ministry ordered two prototypes. Ultimately 214 were made and were used world-wide.

== Success and failure ==
Of the seven Brabazon Report-derived designs that were produced, only two were outright successes, namely the Dove and the Viscount, although neither owed its success to the Brabazon Report:

- De Havilland were designing the Dove as a private venture, having recognised the considerable market for a Dragon Rapide replacement.
- The Viscount is one of the most successful airliners of its class, but the production version was a significantly larger and better aircraft than that specified by the Committee, thanks principally to Rolls-Royce who developed the Dart engine (albeit at a cost of some delay) and the determination of Vickers.

The others were all ill-fated in some way:

- The Type I Brabazon was ill-conceived from the start. The design was tailored to BOAC's perceived needs, which in retrospect seem very odd and were certainly not shared by other airlines. BOAC and the Ministry believed that the passengers of the aircraft would be the particularly well-off or government employees, as they were the only ones able to afford air travel at the time. This led to a large amount of space per passenger in consideration of the long journey duration, which kept its operating costs high and made it too expensive to operate. They failed to consider the possibility of greatly increasing route capacity through the introduction of these designs, and the idea of a large number of passengers in the same airframe was not seriously considered. The airliners already being built in the US such as the Douglas DC-4, Douglas DC-6, Lockheed Constellation and Boeing 377 Stratocruiser were ignored, despite their proven performance and operating economics.
- The Type IIA Ambassador served long but, having conflicted with the Viscount for the BEA order, it was then neglected by de Havilland who instead used the Airspeed factories to produce jet fighters. A proposed version with a turboprop engine could have been in operation long before the conception of the Dart Herald, the Avro 748 and the Fokker Friendship which all entered service in the late 1950s/early 1960s.
- The Type III Britannia ultimately proved to be an excellent design with a long service life, but suffered a prolonged development, largely due to the problems encountered with the Proteus engine. This series of delays before and after entering service led to it being in unequal competition with jet aircraft such as the Boeing 707. It also suffered from the "Buy American" attitude of BOAC. Had Bristol decided to build the proposed interim version with the Centaurus piston engine, the Britannia might have achieved greater sales.
- The Type IV Comet almost became an outstanding success. Two crashes caused by fatigue failure (then a virtually unknown technical issue) grounded them and the design changes required delayed reintroduction long enough for the US to catch up with the Boeing 707.
- The Type VA Marathon suffered from the procurement process and from the collapse of Miles Aircraft.

== Legacy ==
The Brabazon Committee was essentially a failure. All the major designs proposed suffered from protracted development periods at a time when airliners were needed quickly to compete with the American products; this was largely due to the time required to develop the new jet engines but was also due to failures of the Brabazon specifications, the poor decision making of the manufacturers and various UK government Ministries involved, and an amount of prejudice on the part of BOAC, the major customer whose input was not often requested. This prejudice by BOAC was seen subsequently in decisions such as cancelling the Vickers V.1000 airliner, failing to support the Vickers VC10 which had been designed to BOAC's specification, and a continued desire to buy American products. BEA later requested a larger Viscount which became the Vickers Vanguard but which only sold 43, and then insisted on a smaller Trident than the design proposed by Hawker Siddeley. Consequently, the Trident, like the VC-10, failed to sell in significant numbers. The BAC 1-11 was more successful but suffered from a lack of investment in development as much government funding was directed to Concorde. Subsequently, after production of the HS146 ended in 2002, no more complete airliners have been designed or made in the UK, and the industry makes only components.
