= Thomas Rose (RAF officer) =

- Born: 27 January 1895; Chilbolton, Hampshire
- Died: 20 June 1968 (aged 73); Alderney, Channel Islands
- Military career
- Allegiance: United Kingdom
- Branch: British Army; Royal Air Force
- Service years: 1917–1927
- Rank: Flight Lieutenant
- Nickname: "Tommy"
- Units: No. 64 Squadron RFC; No. 43 Squadron RAF
- Conflicts: World War I • Western Front
- Awards: Distinguished Flying Cross
- Other work: Test pilot

Thomas Rose DFC (27 January 1895 – 20 June 1968) was a British flying ace in World War I, credited with 11 victories. Better known as "Tommy" Rose, he also won the King's Cup Air Race in 1935 and from 1939 to 1945 was Chief Test Pilot with Phillips & Powis Aircraft Ltd. – renamed Miles Aircraft Ltd. in 1943.

== World War I ==
Rose joined the Royal Flying Corps in 1917 and was posted to No. 64 Squadron later that year, flying DH.5s. The squadron was involved in the Battle of Cambrai in a ground-strafing role. It subsequently re-equipped with SE5as, which led to greater involvement in aerial combat. He was awarded the DFC in November 1918, having become a deputy flight commander.

== Later military service ==
Following the end of the war, Rose became a flight commander with No. 43 Squadron, RAF, serving from 1925 to 1927.

== Civil aviation career ==
After leaving the RAF with the rank of flight lieutenant, Rose worked in aviation first taking a job at Brooklands in charge of Britain's first petrol station for aeroplanes which was opened there by the Anglo-American Oil Company in April 1927. In 1930 he gave several public aerobatic displays at Brooklands. He enjoyed notable success in air racing when he won the prestigious Kings Cup Air Race in 1935, flying the prototype Miles M.3 Falcon G-ADLC. The following year, in the same aircraft Rose gained the U.K to Cape Town passage record, at 3 days 17 hours and 38 minutes.

Initially joining Phillips & Powis Aircraft Ltd (later Miles Aircraft Ltd) as sales pilot and flying instructor at Woodley Aerodrome near Reading, Berkshire, he became the company's Chief Test Pilot after the unexpected death of Bill Skinner in 1939 and remained in that position throughout World War II. He made the first flights of the Miles M.20/2 fighter (on 15 September 1940), Miles 'X' Minor (February 1942); Miles M.25 Martinet (24 April 1942), Miles M.33 Monitor (5 April 1944) and Miles M.57 Aerovan (26 January 1945).

== Later life ==
Thomas Rose lived (for a time in retirement) in a house on Alderney, Channel Islands. The house, in Les Venelles, carries a blue plaque on the wall.
