= Miles Mohawk =

M.12 Mohawk
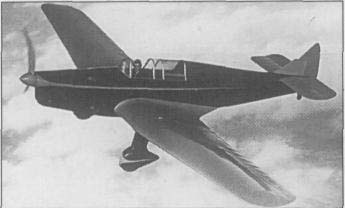
- Miles M.12 Mohawk flown by Charles Lindbergh

General information
- Type: Civil touring aircraft, trainer
- National origin: United Kingdom
- Manufacturer: Phillips & Powis Aircraft
- Designer: G.H. Miles
- Status: On display
- Primary users: Charles Lindbergh Royal Air Force
- Number built: 1

History
- Introduction date: 1 February 1937
- First flight: 22 August 1936
- Retired: 1950

The Miles M.12 Mohawk was a 1930s British two-seat, tandem cabin monoplane built by Phillip & Powis Aircraft (later to become Miles Aircraft) to the order of Charles Lindbergh in 1936. After being used by Lindbergh in Europe it was impressed into service with Royal Air Force as a communications aircraft in 1941.

== Design and development ==
In 1936, after Lindbergh had moved to England, he asked George Herbert Miles to build a fast, long-range machine for use between the various capitals. As a result of close co-operation between the pilot and designer, a first-class design was produced.

The M.12 Mohawk followed earlier Miles Nighthawk and Miles Hawcon designs and practice in having a low wing cantilever monoplane design of spruce structure covered in plywood. The centre section had no dihedral and was of constant section, with outer sections having dihedral and taper towards the tip. The fuselage was similarly a spruce structure with plywood covering. The M.12 was a conventional taildragger with fixed main wheels, each encased in an aerodynamic fairing beneath the wing and a tail wheel. As a purpose-built aircraft to Lindbergh's specifications and incorporating an American 200 hp (150 kW) Menasco Buccaneer B6S engine to the classic Miles low-wing configuration, the M.12 was distinctly an Anglo-American machine. A second set of Miles M.12 wings were used in the M.7A hybrid.

== Operational history ==
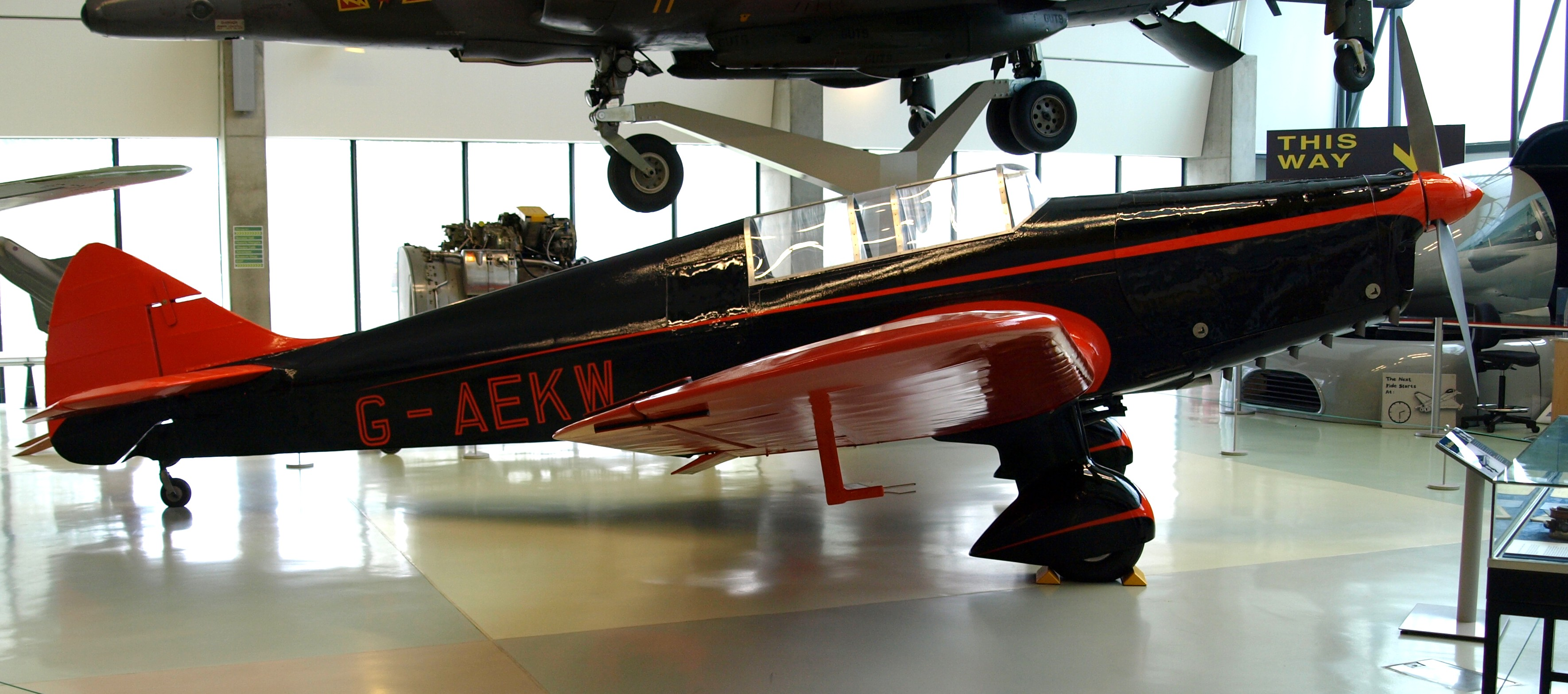
The Miles Mohawk at the Royal Air Force Museum, London.

The M.12 was registered G-AEKW on 17 July 1936 but it first flew on 22 August 1936, wearing the test serial U8. The Mohawk received its certificate of airworthiness on 28 January 1937 and started a series of test flights, including flights by Lindbergh. On 1 February 1937, the aircraft was officially handed over to Lindbergh at a ceremony at Woodley. As soon as the aircraft was handed over, Lindbergh and his wife departed in it on a trip to India. In the following few years, the Lindberghs flew the aircraft all over Europe until Charles Lindbergh flew it in to Woodley on 4 April 1939, placing the aircraft in storage as Lindbergh returned to the United States.

In August 1939, the aircraft was inspected by the Air Ministry for possible impressment into military service. On 31 October 1941, it was impressed into service with the Royal Air Force and given the military serial number HM503. The aircraft was delivered to RAF Turnhouse in Scotland on 8 November 1941. Following the installation of a Fairey-Reed propeller in May 1943, it was delivered to RAF Andover for use by the Maintenance Command Communications Squadron. The M.12 was little used because of difficulties with the Menasco Buccaneer engine, and when the squadron moved to Babdown Farm, they left the Mohawk at Andover. In February 1944, the aircraft was delivered to No. 5 Maintenance Unit at RAF Kemble for storage and was not flown by the RAF again.

In May 1946, the Mohawk was bought by Southern Aircraft (Gatwick) Limited and following refurbishment was advertised for sale in July 1947. In August 1947, the Mohawk was flown into second place at the Folkestone Trophy Air Race at a speed of 138.5 mph. By October 1949, the aircraft was owned by Bruno Pini who along with Neville Browning flew it to North Africa to participate in the Oran International Rally. On 1 January 1950, on the journey home, they were forced to land the aircraft in Spain. Although the aircraft had little damage, it was abandoned, with the pair returning to England. The Miles Mohawk was not to fly again.

In 1973, the Miles Mohawk was discovered in a junkyard near Seville and was rescued by Lew Casey, a curator at the Smithsonian National Air & Space Museum, and taken to the United States for restoration. After many moves and a slow restoration effort, Casey decided to donate the Mohawk to the Royal Air Force Museum. In October 2002, the aircraft was shipped to the United Kingdom and the museum began restoring the aircraft for static display. In August 2008, the restored aircraft was put on display at the "Milestones of Flight" exhibition at the RAF Museum Hendon.

== Operators ==
United Kingdom

- Royal Air Force

== Specifications ==
Data from

General characteristics

- Crew: 2
- Length: 25 ft 6 in (7.77 m)
- Wingspan: 35 ft (11 m)
- Height: 6 ft 6 in (1.98 m)
- Wing area: 182.75 sq ft (16.978 m^{2})
- Empty weight: 1,605 lb (728 kg)
- Gross weight: 2,700 lb (1,225 kg)
- Powerplant: 1 × Menasco Buccaneer B6S air-cooled inverted 6-cylinder inline engine, 200 hp (150 kW)

Performance

- Maximum speed: 190 mph (310 km/h, 170 kn)
- Cruise speed: 170 mph (270 km/h, 150 kn)

== See also ==
- Charles Lindbergh

Related development

- Miles Kestrel
- Miles Martinet

Aircraft of comparable role, configuration, and era

- Percival Gull

Related lists

- List of aircraft of the RAF
