= Stabilator =

Fully movable aircraft stabilizer

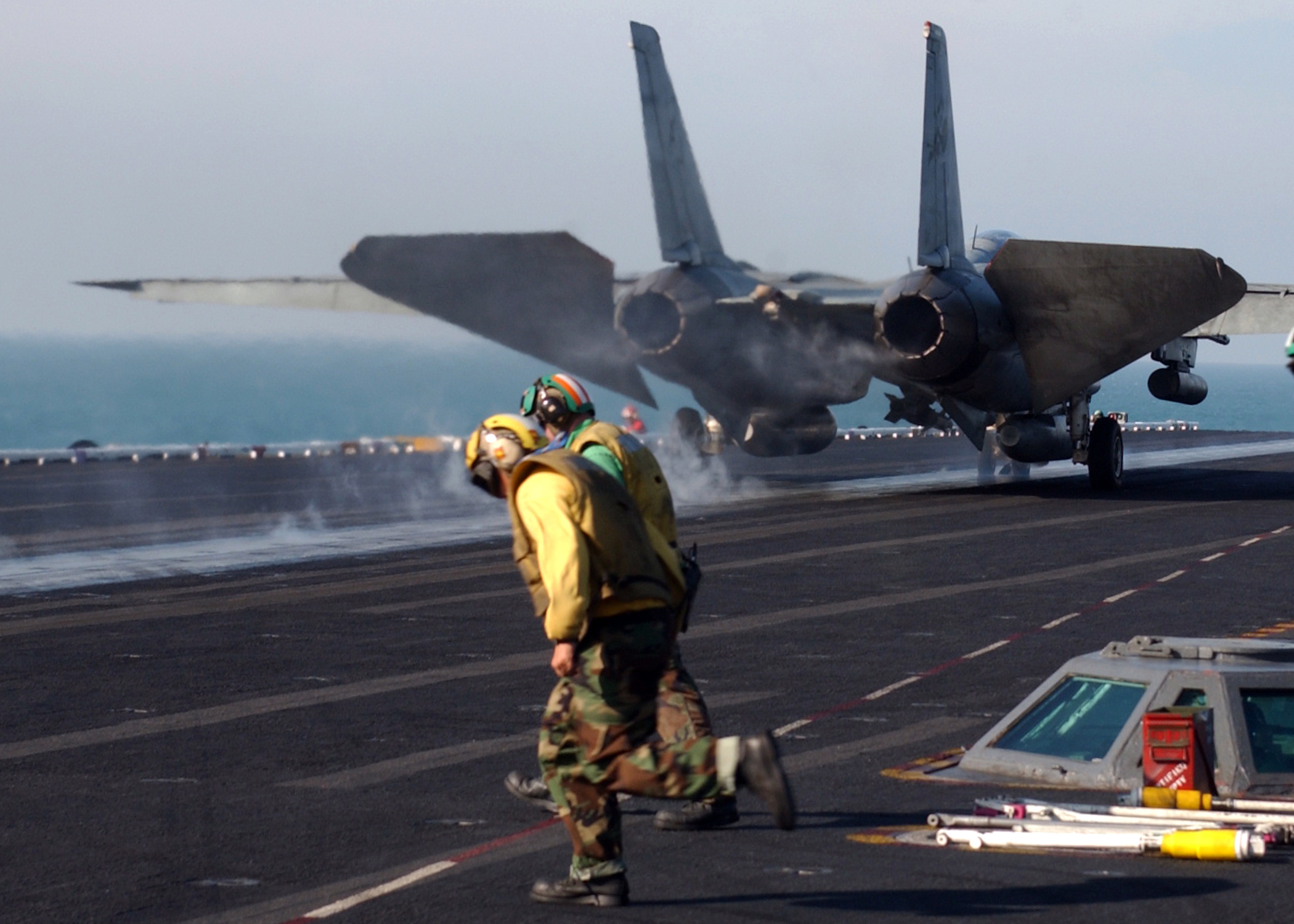
Grumman F-14 Tomcat jet fighter during a takeoff, with stabilators deflected upwards

A stabilator is a fully movable aircraft horizontal stabilizer. It combines the functions of both the fixed stabilizer and the movable elevator, providing longitudinal stability, pitch control, and appropriate stick force. Apart from reduced drag, particularly at high Mach numbers, it is a useful device for changing the aircraft balance within wide limits, and for reducing stick forces.

The term "stabilator" is a portmanteau of stabilizer and elevator. It is also known as an all-moving tailplane (British English), all-movable tail(plane), all-moving stabilizer, all-flying tail (American English), all-flying horizontal tail, full-flying stabilizer, and slab tailplane.

== General aviation ==
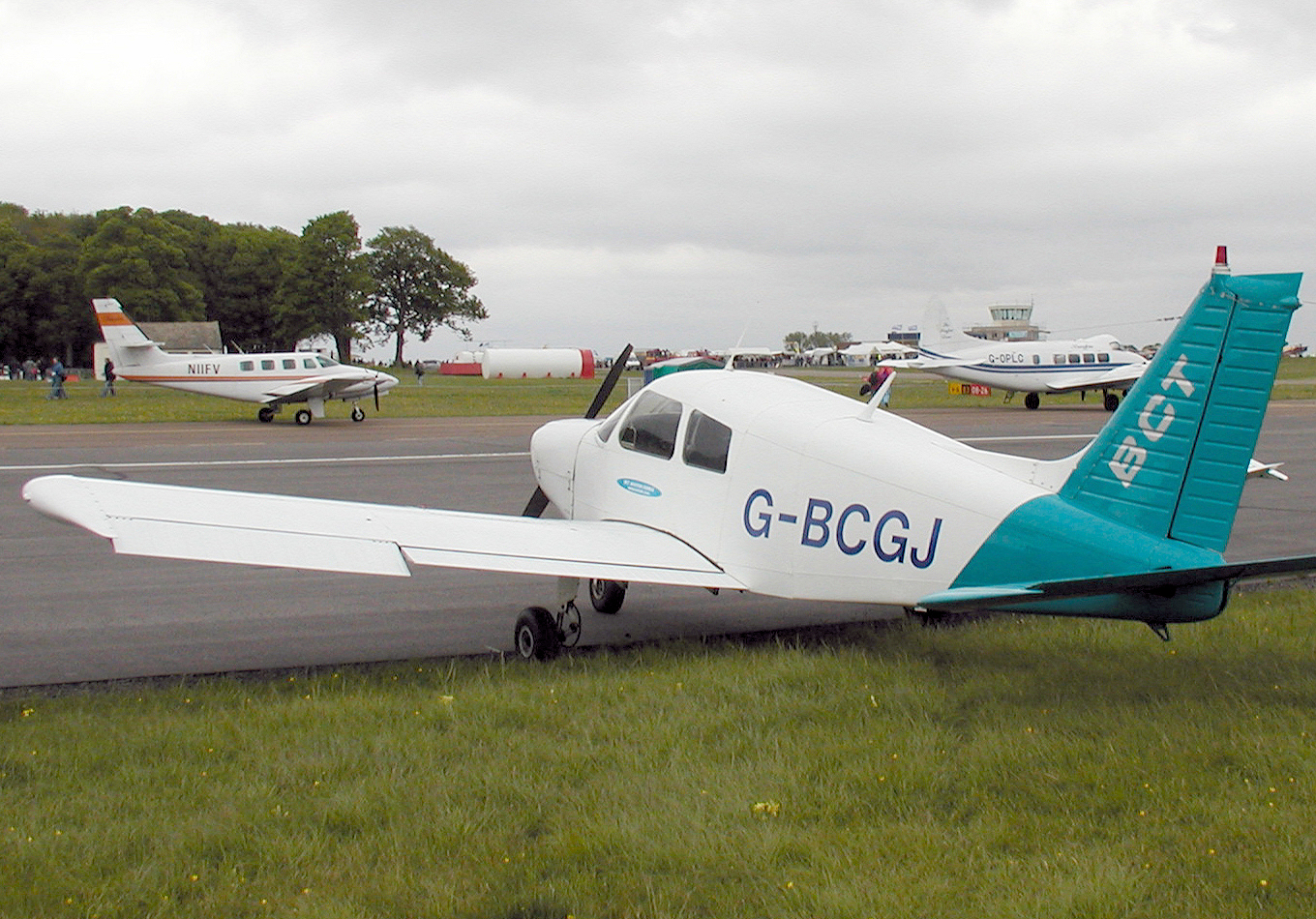
Piper Cherokee with stabilator (and anti-servo tab) deflected upwards

Because it involves a moving balanced surface, a stabilator can allow the pilot to generate a given pitching moment with a lower control force. Due to the high forces involved in tail balancing loads, stabilators are designed to pivot about their aerodynamic center (near the tail's mean quarter-chord). This is the point at which the pitching moment is constant regardless of the angle of attack, and thus any movement of the stabilator can be made without added pilot effort. However, to be certified by the appropriate regulatory agency, an airplane must show an increasing resistance to an increasing pilot input (movement). To provide this resistance, stabilators on small aircraft contain an anti-servo tab (usually acting also as a trim tab) that deflects in the same direction as the stabilator, thus providing an aerodynamic force resisting the pilot's input. General aviation aircraft with stabilators include the Piper Cherokee and the Cessna 177. The Glaser-Dirks DG-100 glider initially used a stabilator without an anti-servo tab to increase resistance: as a result, the pitch movement of the glider is very sensitive. Later models used a conventional stabilizer and elevator.

== Military ==
In transonic flight shock waves form on the upper surface of the wing at a different point from the lower surface. As speed increases, the shock wave moves backwards over the wing. On conventional tails this high pressure causes the elevator to be deflected downwards.

All-flying tailplanes were used on many pioneer aircraft and the popular Morane-Saulnier G, H and L monoplanes from France as well as the early Fokker Eindecker monoplane and Halberstadt D.II biplane fighters from Germany all flew with them, although at the cost of stability: none of these aircraft, with the possible exception of the biplane Halberstadts, could be flown hands-off.

Stabilators were developed to achieve adequate pitch control in supersonic flight, and are almost universal on modern military combat aircraft.

The British wartime Miles M.52 supersonic project was designed with stabilators. Though the design only flew as a scale rocket, its all-flying tail was tested on the Miles Falcon. The contemporary American supersonic project, the Bell X-1, used separately-adjustable horizontal stabilizer and elevators allowing movement as a single surface or elevator deflection at a fixed tailplane setting.

Entering service in 1951, the Boeing B-47 Stratojet was the world's first purposely built jet bomber to include one piece stabilator design. A stabilator was considered for the Boeing B-52 Stratofortress but rejected due to the unreliability of hydraulics at the time.

The North American F-86 Sabre, the first U.S. Air Force aircraft which could go supersonic (although in a shallow dive) was introduced with a conventional horizontal stabilizer with elevators, which was eventually replaced with a stabilator.

When stabilators can move differentially to perform the roll control function of ailerons, as they do on many modern fighter aircraft they are known as elevons or rolling tails. A canard surface, looking like a stabilator but not stabilizing like a tailplane, can also be mounted in front of the main wing in a canard configuration (Curtiss-Wright XP-55 Ascender).

Stabilators on military aircraft have the same problem of too light control forces (inducing overcontrol) as general aviation aircraft. Unlike light aircraft, supersonic aircraft are not fitted with anti-servo tabs, which would add unacceptable drag. In older jet fighter aircraft, a resisting force was generated within the control system, either by springs or a resisting hydraulic force, rather than by an external anti-servo tab. For example, the North American F-100 Super Sabre, used gearing and a variable stiffness spring attached to the control stick to provide an acceptable resistance to pilot input. In modern fighters, control inputs are processed by computers ("fly by wire"), and there is no direct connection between the pilot's stick and the stabilator.

== Airliners ==
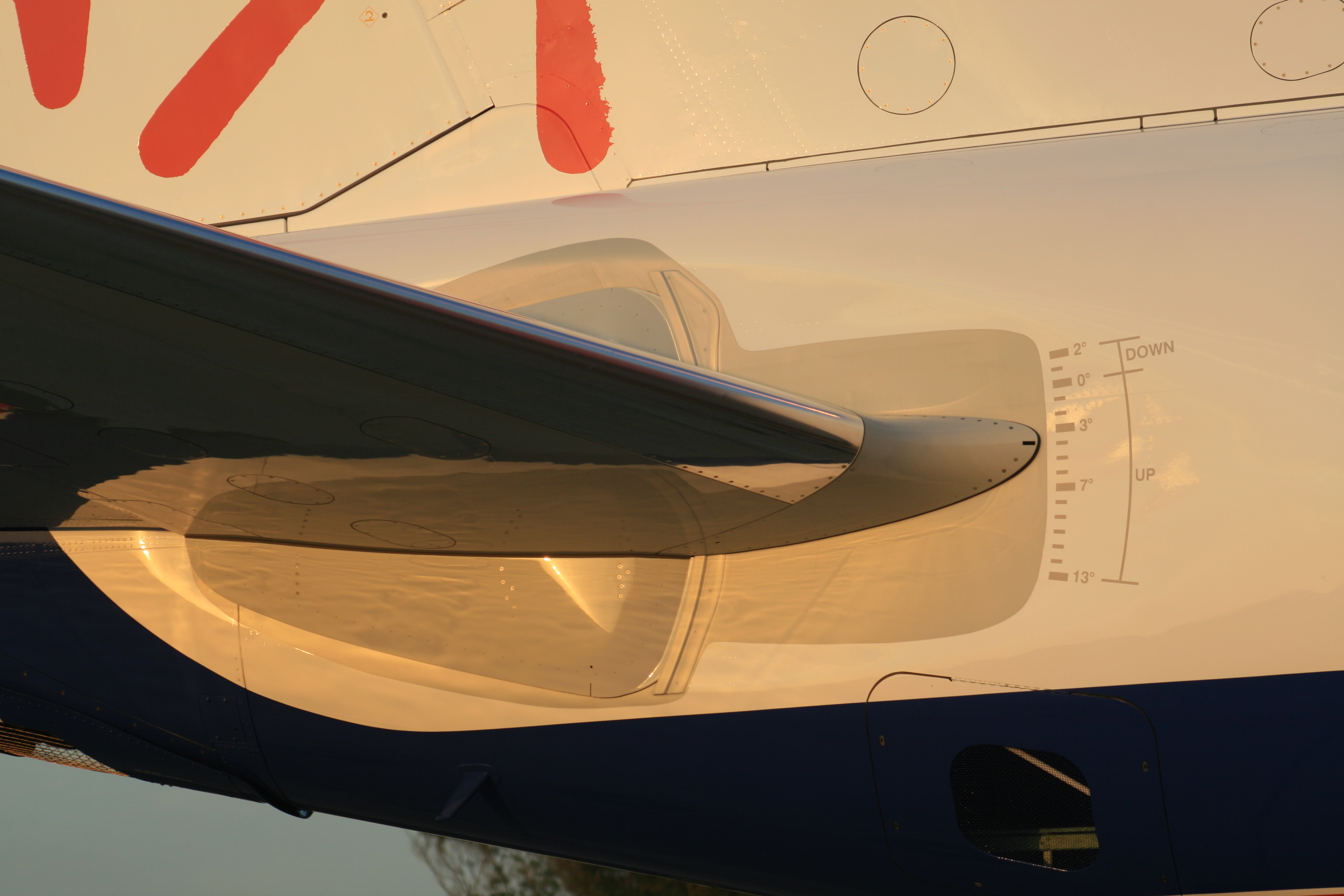
Adjustable stabilizer on an Embraer E170, with markings showing the degree of nose-up and nose-down trim available

Most modern airliners use an adjustable horizontal stabilizer and a separate elevator control, rather than a stabilator. The movable horizontal stabilizer is adjusted to keep the pitch axis in trim during flight as the speed changes, or as fuel is burned and the center of gravity moves. These adjustments are commanded by the autopilot when it is engaged, or by the human pilot if the plane is being flown manually. Adjustable stabilizers are not the same as stabilators: a stabilator is controlled by the pilot's control yoke or stick, whereas an adjustable stabilizer is controlled by the trim system.

In the Boeing 737, the adjustable stabilizer trim system is powered by an electrically operated jackscrew.

One example of an airliner with a true stabilator used for flight control is the Lockheed L-1011.

== See also ==
- Canard
- Index of aviation articles
