= Empire Air Mail Scheme =

Air mail program by the British government

Empire Air Mail Scheme (EAMS) was an attempt by the British Air Ministry to regain leadership of world civil aviation in the late 1930s following the establishment of The Air Mail Route from Cairo to Bagdad in the early 1920s. Conceived in 1934 by Sir Eric Geddes, chairman of Imperial Airways, EAMS sought to greatly expand British civil aviation by shifting all 'first class' mail within the British Empire by air. Imperial Airways was a private company, but like most airlines of the era, relied on public subsidies (in this case, from the Air Ministry) to support its operations. A critical driving force behind EAMS was Sir Christopher Llewellyn Bullock, KCB CBE, Permanent Under-Secretary at the British Air Ministry from 1931 to 1936. Appointed at the age of 38, he remains one of the youngest civil servants to have headed a British Government department.

EAMS was a hugely expensive plan, and to make it financially acceptable to the British Government, subsidies were required to support it from the dominions (especially South Africa, India and Australia) and colonies of the Empire. In this way, EAMS served another of Geddes' aims, namely to prevent local Indian, South African and Australian operators from opening up international air routes.

Political agreement from within the Empire was finally reached in early 1937, after the Australians held out for a better financial deal. Australian aviation experts were deeply sceptical about the Scheme from the start, and were especially concerned that Imperial Airways had decided on the use of flying boats to operate the new services, even before final agreement was reached. Geddes preferred flying boats because he thought the cost of expanding airfields throughout the Empire would be too great, and the cost of fuel would be lower along the coastline in comparison with inland airfields.

The use of flying boats quickly exposed the frailties of the Scheme once it became operational. The first service from Alexandria, Egypt began in December 1936, and that to Durban, South Africa commenced the following year. However, the service to Australia did not begin until July 1938, owing to difficulties in building alighting stations in the difficult geographic and climatic conditions in northern Australia. The Short C Class Empire flying boats were easily damaged. In December 1938, the Scheme was in crisis, as some Shorts flying boats were out of service due to accidents, while the cheap subsidised mail rates offered to the public attracted a flood of letters that the British Air Ministry never expected. To shift this huge quantity of mail while their own fleet steadily diminished, Imperial Airways scoured Europe for aircraft on short-term leases, including American Douglas airliners from Swissair. An official review of the Scheme in early 1939 then concluded that the amount of mail to be carried at peak times like the Christmas season could never be lifted without an uneconomic number of 'reserve' aircraft that would then be idle for the rest of the year. The outbreak of the war in September 1939 brought the Scheme to an end; by then, British officials had concluded the original selection of flying boats was a mistake, and British aviation needed to shift back to landplanes. However, the demands of war prevented British industry from building new prototype landplanes for which orders had been placed, the Fairey FC1 and the Short S.32.

== Bibliography ==
- Barnes, Christopher (1989). Shorts Aircraft Since 1900. London: Putnam.
- Davies, R E G (1964). A History of the World's Airlines. Oxford: Oxford University Press.
- Ewer, Peter (2007). "A Gentlemen's Club in the Clouds: Re-assessing the Empire Air Mail Scheme 1933–1939". Journal of Transport History. 28 (1). doi:10.7227/TJTH.28.1.6. S2CID 144016759.
- Ewer, Peter (2009). Wounded Eagle: The Bombing of Darwin and Australia's Air Defence Scandal. Sydney: New Holland. ISBN 9781741108255.
- Findlay, Michael; Barton, Gerry (2015). "The Final Link in the Empire Route: New Zealand and the TEAL Short Solent Flying Boat". In Cooper, Annabel; Paterson, Lachy; Wanhalla, Angela (eds.). The Lives of Colonial Objects. Otago University Press. pp. 304–309. ISBN 9781927322024.
- Smith, Richard (1983). "The Intercontinental Airliner and the Essence of Airplane Performance 1929–1939". Technology and Culture. 24 (3): 428–449. doi:10.2307/3104760. JSTOR 3104760. S2CID 111745609.
