= Miles Nighthawk =

1930s British civil utility aircraft

M.7 Nighthawk
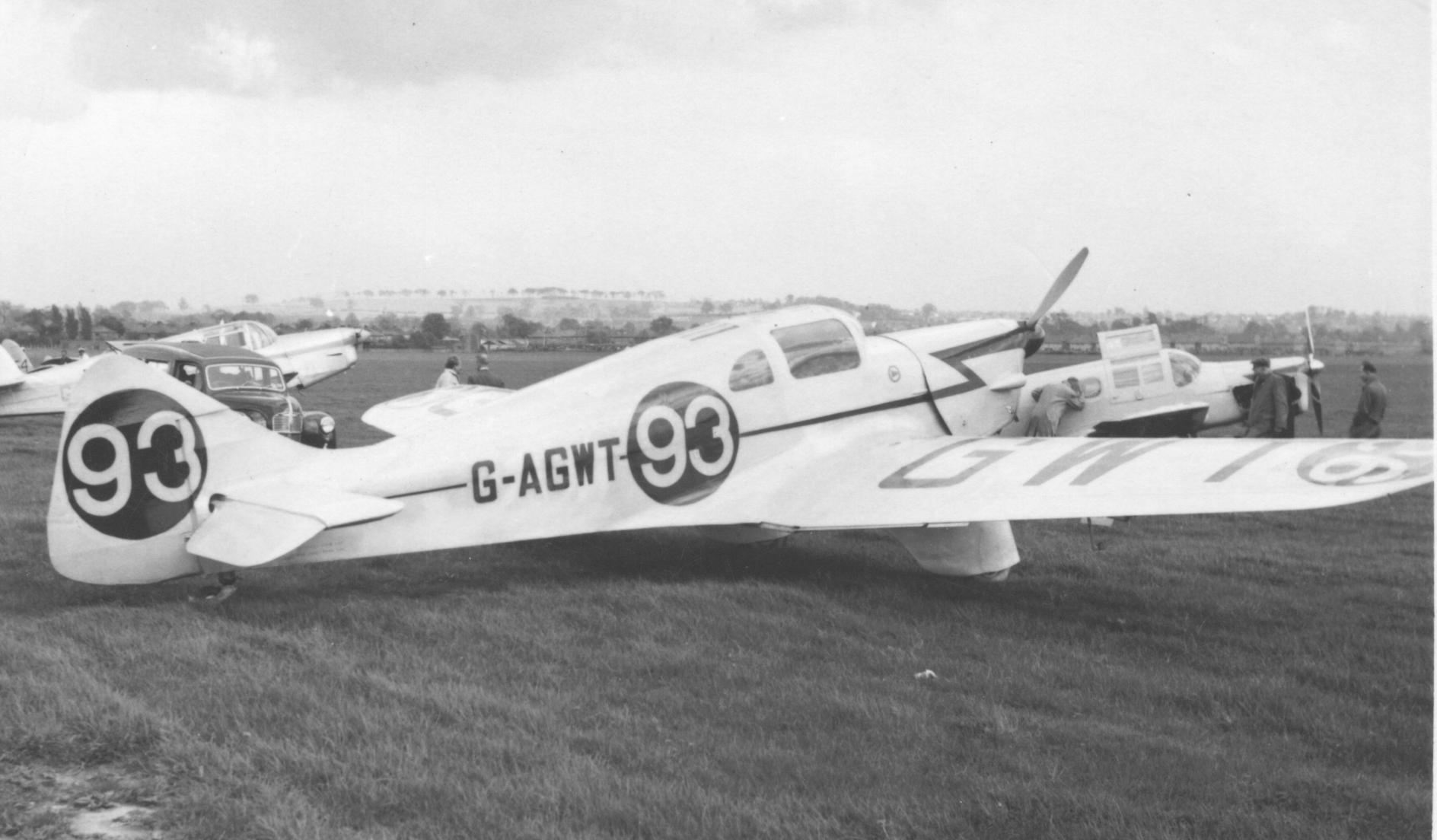
- Miles M.7A Nighthawk wearing racing colours at Wolverhampton (Pendeford) Airport in May 1953

General information
- Type: Four-seat training monoplane
- Manufacturer: Miles Aircraft Limited
- Primary users: Royal Romanian Air Force Royal Air Force
- Number built: 5

History
- First flight: 18 December 1935
- Developed from: Miles M.3B Falcon Six
- Variants: Miles M.16 Mentor

The Miles M.7 Nighthawk was a 1930s British training and communications monoplane designed by Miles Aircraft Limited.

== Design and development ==
The M.7 Nighthawk was developed from the Miles Falcon Six intended as a training and communications aircraft. The prototype, registered G-ADXA, was first flown in 1935, it was a low-wing monoplane powered by a 200 hp (149 kW) de Havilland Gipsy Six piston engine. The prototype crashed during spinning trials at Woodley Aerodrome in January 1937. Four production aircraft followed.

The design was modified to meet an Air Ministry specification and produced as the M.16 Mentor. In 1944 a Nighthawk fuselage was fitted with the wings from a Mohawk and fitted with a 205 hp (153 kW) de Havilland Gipsy Six Series II engine with a variable pitch airscrew. It was designated the M.7A Nighthawk. The last Nighthawk to remain airworthy was G-AGWT in the early 1960s. This aircraft was raced in many postwar UK air competitions, but is no longer extant.

== Operational history ==
Two aircraft were delivered to the Royal Romanian Air Force in 1936 and one was delivered to the Royal Air Force in May 1937 with serial number L6846. It was used as a VIP transport by No. 24 Squadron RAF.

== Variants ==
M.7
Production version with a 200 hp (149 kW) de Havilland Gipsy Six piston engine, two built.
M.7A
Four-seat variant built for the Romanian Government, two built.
M.7A (Hybrid)
Hybrid version with Nighthawk fuselage and wings from a Mohawk and powered by a 205 hp (153 kW) de Havilland Gipsy Six Series II engine, one built.

== Operators ==
Romania
Royal Romanian Air Force
United Kingdom

- Royal Air Force
  - No. 24 Squadron RAF

== Specifications (M.7) ==
Data from British Civil Aircraft 1919-1972:Volume III

General characteristics

- Crew: One
- Length: 25 ft 0 in (7.62 m)
- Wingspan: 35 ft 0 in (10.67 m)
- Empty weight: 1,650 lb (750 kg)
- Gross weight: 2,400 lb (1,090 kg)
- Powerplant: 1 × de Havilland Gipsy Six piston engine , 200 hp (149 kW)

Performance

- Maximum speed: 175 mph (282 km/h, 152 kn)
- Cruise speed: 155 mph (250 km/h, 135 kn)
- Service ceiling: 23,000 ft (7,000 m)
- Rate of climb: 1,000 ft/min (5.1 m/s)

== See also ==
Related lists

- List of aircraft of the RAF
