= EAMS =

EAMS may refer to:

- Early Access to Medicines Scheme, a form of expanded access to unapproved drugs in the United Kingdom
- Euro Area Member States, members of the Eurozone
- Empire Air Mail Scheme
