= Miles M.26 =

M.26

General information
- Type: Airliner
- National origin: United Kingdom
- Manufacturer: Miles Aircraft
- Status: Cancelled
- Number built: 0

History
- Variant: Miles M.30

Miles M.26 was the designation used to cover the family of X-series design proposals, for long-range transport aircraft. The common factors of most X design proposals were the use of a blended wing body and engines buried in the wings, based on principles patented by Nicolas Woyevodsky. A sub-scale prototype of the X.9 proposal was constructed, designated the Miles M.30.

== Variants ==
Data from: Miles aircraft since 1925

X.2
The X.2 design was first published in Flight in 1938, from work begun in 1936. A projected 300 mph 38-seat transport of about 48,000 lb loaded with 1,000 mile range, it did not use a lifting body fuselage. Initial design powered by four unspecified 900 hp (670 kW) air-cooled Rolls-Royce piston engines. Span 99 ft (30 m), gross weight 61,000 lb (28,000 kg). Met with a cool reaction by the Air Ministry only receiving a paltry £25,000 development contract and a wooden mock-up to Specification 42/37.
X.3
A projected six-engined variant.
X.4 to X.8
Variants of the X blended wing theme which didn't proceed further than the concept stage, including an eight-engined transatlantic airliner. (X.8)
X.9
A design for a four-engined transport, submitted to the Ministry of Aircraft Production (MAP) in Autumn of 1942, powered by four Rolls-Royce Griffon V-12 piston engines and fitted with retractable tricycle undercarriage.
X.10
A small twin-engined airliner / transport, following the blended wing concept but with externally mounted engines.
X.11
After the Brabazon Committee released the Type I specification (later developed into Air Ministry Specification 2/44) for the post-war transatlantic airliner, only to Bristol, F.G. Miles unofficially submitted a design based on the Xseries of blended wing aircraft. The X.11 was to be eight-engined, with high cruising speed (for 1943), high wing loading and low power loading, seating at least 50 passengers, but was rejected. (Span 150 ft (46 m), gross weight 165,000 lb (75,000 kg)).
X.12
A bomber version of the X.11
X.13
A troop transport version of the X.11
X.14
After rejection of the X.11, Miles was unofficially encouraged to submit a design for a smaller aircraft not competing with the Brabazon specifications, powered by four 2,400 hp (1,800 kW) Bristol Centaurus radial engines, with a span of 150 ft (46 m) and gross weight of 120,000 lb (54,000 kg)). This submission was also summarily rejected.
X.15
A revised X.14, to be powered by six Napier Sabre H-24 in-line engines.
Miles M.30
X-Minor sub-scale aerodynamic test-bed / research aircraft for the X.9 project.

== Specifications (M.26 X.9) ==
Data from Miles aircraft since 1925

General characteristics

- Crew: 4? plus cabin crew
- Capacity: 100 seats / 12,196 lb (5,532 kg) (Estimated)
- Length: 80 ft (24 m)
- Wingspan: 116 ft (35 m)
- Wing area: 1,485 sq ft (138.0 m^{2})
- Aspect ratio: 9.1
- Empty weight: 37,000 lb (16,783 kg)
- Gross weight: 76,000 lb (34,473 kg)
- Powerplant: 4 × Rolls-Royce Griffon II V-12 liquid-cooled piston engines, 2,000 hp (1,500 kW) each plus

Performance

- Cruise speed: 295 mph (475 km/h, 256 kn) at 8,000 ft (2,400 m), 275 mph (239 kn; 443 km/h) at 22,000 ft (6,700 m)
- Range: 2,600 mi (4,200 km, 2,300 nmi)
- Wing loading: 51.3 lb/sq ft (250 kg/m^{2})
