= Miles Aircraft =

British aircraft manufacturer, 1943–1947

Miles Aircraft Ltd
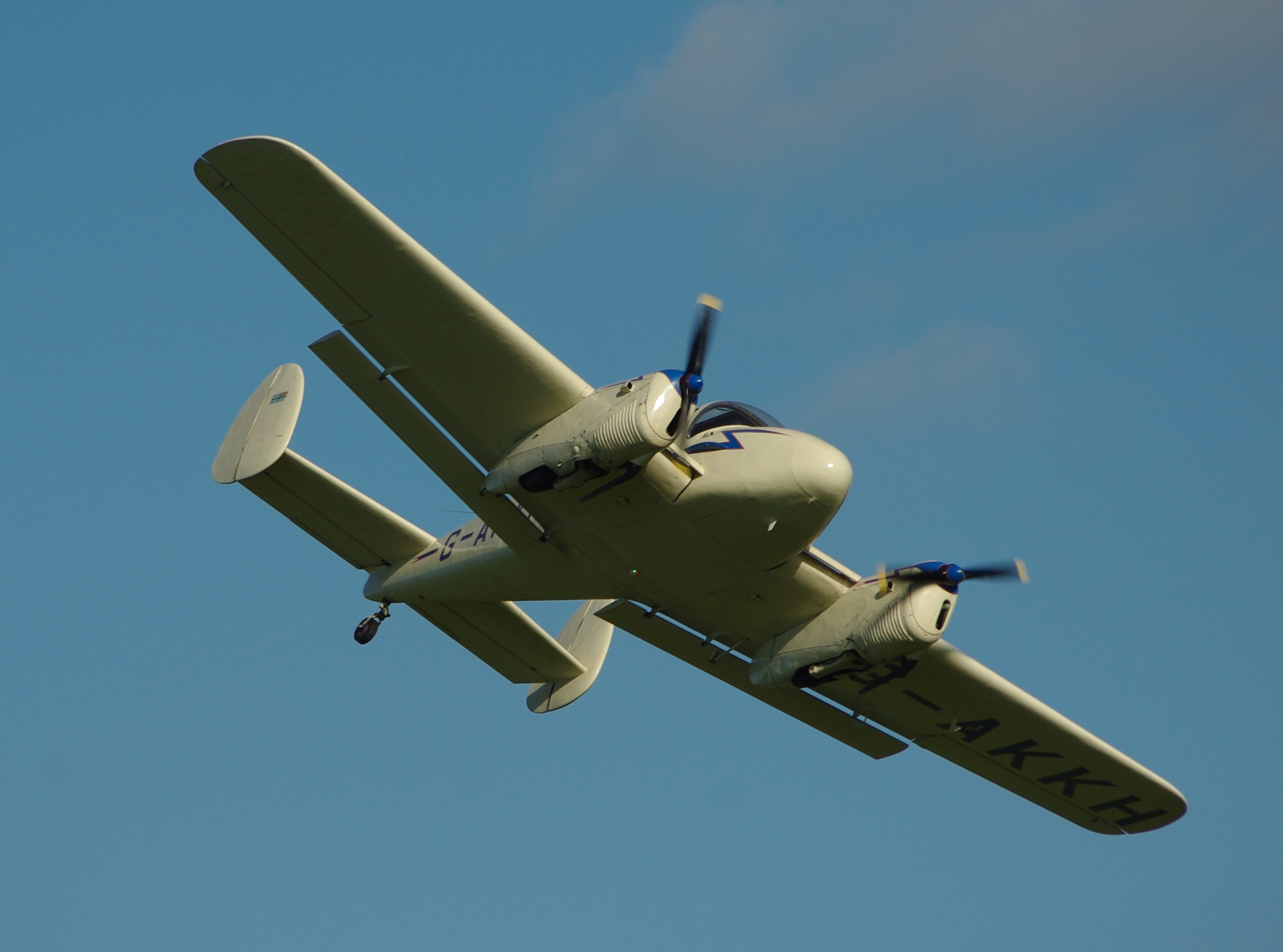
- Miles Gemini of the 1940s
- Industry: Aviation
- Founded: 1930s (as Phillips & Powis Aircraft)
- Defunct: 1947
- Fate: Aviation interests taken on by Handley Page
- Successor: F.G.Miles Ltd / Handley Page Reading Ltd / Western Manufacturing Ltd
- Headquarters: Woodley, Berkshire, UK
- Key people: Fred, Blossom & George Miles Test pilots included Thomas Rose and Ken Waller.
- Products: Aircraft, photocopiers, book binding equipment, fasteners (self locking nuts), actuators

Miles was the name used for aircraft and associated businesses of British engineer Frederick George Miles, who, with his wife – aviator and draughtswoman Maxine "Blossom" Miles (née Forbes-Robertson) – and his brother George Herbert Miles, designed numerous light civil and military aircraft and a range of curious prototypes, primarily between 1943 and 1947.

== History ==
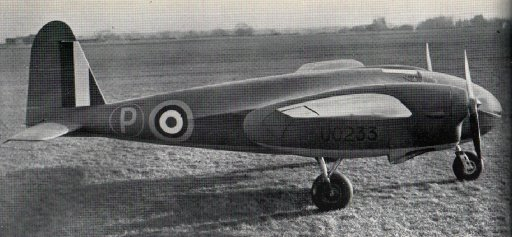
The M.30 'X Minor' flying aerodynamics testbed

=== Phillips and Powis ===
A company was founded in 1928 by Charles Powis and Jack Phillips as Phillips & Powis Aircraft (Reading) Ltd. In 1929 they opened Woodley Aerodrome, near the town of Reading, Berkshire.

In 1936, Rolls-Royce bought into the company. Although aircraft were produced under the Miles name, it was not until 1943 that the firm became Miles Aircraft Limited when Rolls-Royce's interests were bought out.

The company needed to increase production of the Miles Messenger and to do so it took over a former linen mill in Banbridge, County Down, Northern Ireland for the production of components of the aircraft. A hangar at RAF Long Kesh was used for assembly of the aircraft and flight testing was carried out at the airfield. The company moved to Newtownards following the end of the war in 1946.

The company opened the Miles Aeronautical Technical School in 1943 under the directorship of Maxine (Blossom) Miles The school had a "Headmaster", Walter Evans.

=== Bankruptcy and receivership ===
In 1947, the company entered receivership following bankruptcy proceedings instigated by Titanine Ltd., in the Chancery Division of the High Court. Titanine supplied Miles with aviation coatings used in the production of the Miles Gemini aircraft. Mr. Justice Wynn-Parry adjourned the petition of Titanine Ltd., for the winding up of Miles Aircraft Ltd., until 19 January 1948, on the grounds that the company had shown prima facie reasons for not yet having formulated a reorganization scheme. The petitioners, creditors for £5,837, were supported by other creditors for £62,000 and opposed by creditors for £200,000. An affidavit put into court showed that subject to audit, a loss of £630,000 had been incurred on 31 October 1947, but that a rescue plan could not be drawn up until the audit was completed. The principal trade creditors were: Blackburn Aircraft Ltd., De La Rue Extrusions Ltd., Smiths Aircraft Instruments Ltd. and the Sperry Gyroscope Co. Ltd. Mr. F. G. Miles announced the payment of the 4% per cent preference dividends out of his own resources of £8,600. After Miles Aircraft had been taken over by financiers in 1947, the design and manufacture of aircraft was ended by the new Board. At this time the company had some £5 million worth of business in hand, including substantial orders for the Messenger and the Gemini.

In 1948 an application by the Board of Trade for the appointment of an inspector to investigate the affairs of Miles Aircraft Ltd. was granted by Mr. Justice Roxburgh. The B.O.T. case was that when a prospectus was issued in March, 1947 (before the accounts for 1946 were published), the directors should reasonably have been expected to know that all was not well with the company, and when, in August, 1947, a dividend of 7% per cent and a bonus of 24% were recommended, they should reasonably have been expected to know that a big loss was being suffered by the company.

Charges were brought against Sir William Malcolm Mount and F. G. Miles. There were 24 charges regarding publication of a Miles Aircraft Ltd prospectus with "false and reckless statements". The trial began on 10 May 1950 at the Old Bailey. After 17 days of sitting, the jury stopped the case against Miles and Sir William, and they were discharged. They had appeared on charges of inducing people to acquire shares in the company by making a misleading forecast and dishonestly concealing a material fact in a prospectus. According to Flight, "Twenty of the original 24 counts were thrown out before the defence was reached. The prosecution alleged that the defendants gave a misleading forecast that for 1947 the profit covering the production of aircraft would have been £75,000, whereas there was a substantial loss. It was alleged that they recklessly made the misleading statement that the company had orders on hand which were sufficient to ensure production for the following two years, and that they dishonestly concealed the fact that a profit for the manufacture of aircraft in 1947 was unlikely." Both men said that they believed every word of the prospectus was true. After the acquittal, an application for costs for £20,000 was disallowed.

The aviation assets were purchased by Handley Page as Handley Page Reading Ltd. Handley Page produced the Miles-designed M.60 Marathon as the H.P.R.1 Marathon. The Miles Aeronautical Technical School was taken over by the Reading Technical College. Other products in which Miles had interests included photocopiers; this business became Copycat Ltd, which was acquired by the Nashua Corporation in 1963. The Philidas locking nut unit became an independent company. The bookbinding machinery and actuator production were taken over by a specifically formed company, the Western Manufacturing Estate Ltd, the name "Western" referring to its location on the Woodley aerodrome. This company later merged with the Adamant Engineering Company Ltd. to form the Adwest Group. Miles also manufactured ballpoint pens designed by László Bíró through an associated company, the Miles Martin Pen Co. Ltd.

=== F. G. Miles Limited ===
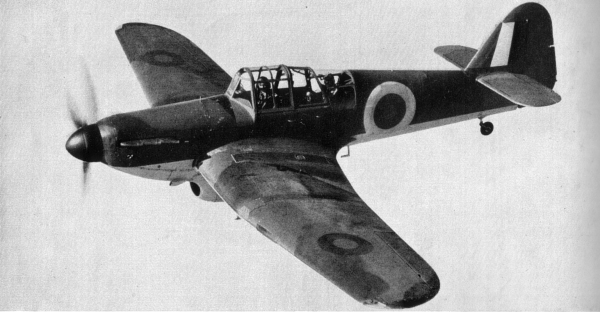
Miles Master trainer in flight during the Second World War

In 1948, F.G. Miles founded F. G. Miles Limited, which continued to produce aircraft under the Miles brand. The company was based on two sites, Redhill Aerodrome and Shoreham Aerodrome. In 1961, the aviation interests were purchased (along with Auster Aircraft Limited) by British Executive and General Aviation Limited (Beagle Aircraft), initially as Beagle-Miles Ltd, with George Herbert Miles as Chief Designer and Technical Director.

The company adopted a group structure with subsidiary companies as follows: Meridian Airmaps Ltd (whose collection of aerial photographs forms part of the English Heritage Archive), Miles Development Products Ltd, Miles Electronics Ltd, Miles Marine & Structural Plastics Ltd and Jet Tanks Ltd. The group was initially based at Redhill, but moved to Shoreham in 1953.

Miles Electronics was involved in the manufacture of flight simulators; this division merged with the UK arm of the Link Trainer flight simulator company and was later acquired by the Singer Corporation. In 1975 Hunting Associated Industries acquired a controlling interest in F. G. Miles Engineering and all its subsidiaries. The company was renamed Hunting Hivolt and Jeremy Miles, the son of Fred Miles (who founded the firm), became a non-executive director on the board. Other companies included Miles HiVolt Ltd and Miles-Dufon Ltd (this company went into administration on 15 April 1980).

Design work between F. G. Miles Ltd and the French company, Hurel-Dubois, resulted in the HDM.105 – a standard Miles Aerovan fitted with an Hurel-Dubois high-aspect-ratio wing. This work led to the Hurel-Dubois HD.34 and the Short Skyvan series of aircraft.

== Aircraft designs ==
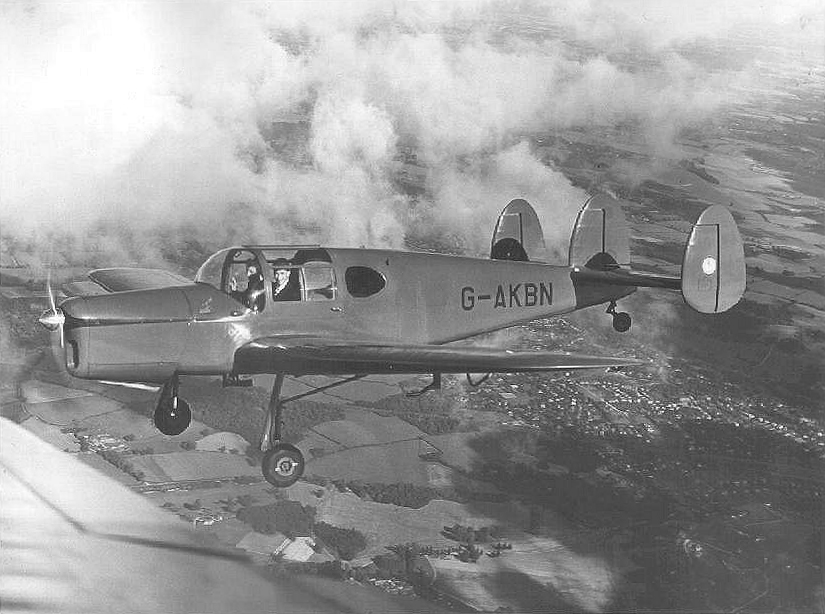
M38 Miles Messenger G-AKBN photographed c. 1951

The company's earlier aircraft include the Hawk Trainer and its military variant, the Magister, as well as the Messenger and the Gemini. During the Second World War, it produced the Master advanced trainer, as well as the Martinet and Monitor target tugs.

The aircraft designed by Miles were often technologically and aerodynamically advanced for their time; the M.20 emergency production fighter prototype outperformed contemporary Hawker Hurricanes, despite having fixed landing gear. The X Minor was a flying testbed for blended wing-fuselage designs, although the large commercial transport intended to be produced from this research never entered production. The gigantic Miles X Airliner was to seat 55 and have eight engines buried in the wings, driving four sets of contra-rotating props and achieve a range of 3,450 miles.

The Miles Libellula (named after dragonflies) were experimental tandem-wing designs. A fighter prototype M.35, designed to give the pilot a better landing view, and to fit on aircraft carriers without a need for folding wings, was funded and built by the company (with wood) in only six weeks but was rejected by the Ministry of Aircraft Production. A bomber version was designed, and then a prototype ordered for a "high speed bomber" requirement, but that prototype was never built. Instead, the company built a 5/8th scale version M.39B which was sold to the government for research and testing; it was scrapped after being damaged and the bomber procurement had been cancelled. Tandem-wing designs, with a wing at both ends of an aircraft, reduce centre of gravity problems due to fuel or ammunition usage.

The Miles M.52 was a turbojet-powered supersonic research aircraft project that was cancelled before completion.

== Aircraft ==
The following table lists the company number, name, year of first flight and number produced of all Miles aircraft.

No.	Name	Year	Produced	Type of aircraft
	Southern Martlet	1929	6	
	Metal Martlet	1930	1	
	Falcon Four	1931		Light cabin twin. Two Cirrus Hermes engines in overwing pusher configuration.
M.1	Satyr	1932	1	
M.2	Hawk	1933	55	two-seat light monoplane
M.2F-T	Hawk Major	1934	64	Hawk successor with de Havilland Gipsy Major engine
M.2E,L,U	Hawk Speed Six	1934	3	racing version of Hawk Major with de Havilland Gipsy Six engine
M.2W,X,Y	Hawk Trainer		25	two-seat touring and racing monoplane
M.3A	Falcon Major	1934	19	
M.3B	Falcon Six	1935	17	
M.3E	Gillette Falcon	1944	1 modified M.3B	research for the supersonic M.52
M.4	Merlin	1935	4	
M.5	Sparrowhawk	1935	5	
M.6	Hawcon	1935	1	
M.7	Nighthawk	1935	6	
M.8	Peregrine	1936	2	
M.9	Kestrel	1937	1	
M.9A	Master I	1939	900	advanced trainer
M.11	Whitney Straight	1936	50	
M.11C	M.11C		1	
M.12	Mohawk	1937	1	
M.13	Hobby	1937	1	
M.14	Magister	1937	1,293	basic military trainer
M.14	Hawk Trainer III	1937	52	Magister for civil and export sales
M.15	M.15	1939	2	Air Ministry Specification T.1/37
M.16	Mentor	1938	45	three-seat training and communications monoplane
M.17	Monarch	1938	11	
M.18	M.18	1938	3	
M.19	Master II	1939	1,699	advanced trainer
M.20	M20/2	1940	2	prototype low-cost fighter
M.22A	design only			designed to F.18/40 specification for a turret-equipped night-fighter
M.24	Master Fighter	1940	26	emergency conversion of trainer design to fighter, retrospectively numbered M.24
M.25	Martinet	1943	1,724	target tug
M.26	"X"		0	planned 55-seat trans-Atlantic airliner
M.27	Master III	1940	602	
M.28	Mercury	1941	6	training or communications
M.30	X Minor	1942	1	small-scale prototype for Miles X airline design
M.33	Monitor	1944	22	twin-engined target tug
M.35	M.35 Libellula	1942	1	tandem-wing design fighter
M.37	Martinet Trainer	1946	2	two-seat trainer
M.38	Messenger	1942	80	liaison and private owner aircraft
M.39B	M.39B Libellula	1943	1	scale aircraft of tandem-wing M.39 fast bomber design
M.42 and M.43	not built			designs tendered for an "Army Direct Support Aircraft" (i.e. a ground attack aircraft). Both tandem wing, one with twin Merlin, other with single Griffon engine.
M.44	not built			another design for the ground attack specification, conventional design with twin Merlins
M.48	Messenger 3	1945	1	Messenger development
M.52	M.52		0	supersonic research aircraft design
M.50	Queen Martinet	1944	65	unmanned target drone version of Martinet
M.57	Aerovan	1945	48	STOL transport
M.60	Marathon I	1945	42	civil airliner design – would become Handley Page Marathon
M.63B	not built			Tandem wing jet mailplane
M.64	L.R.5	1945	1	Single engined two seat light aircraft
M.65	Gemini	1945	170	private small aircraft
M.68	Boxcar	1947	1	transport with detachable cargo container
M.69	Marathon II	1949	1	Mamba turboprop powered project
M.71	Merchantman	1947	1	4-engined development of Aerovan layout
M.75	Aries	1951	2	development of Gemini with more powerful engines
M.76	M.76	1953	1	development of 2-seat glider for the British Gliding Association
M.77	Sparrowjet	1953	1	conversion of M.5 Sparrowhawk
M.100	Student	1957	1	single engined two seat jet trainer
M.105	H.D.M.105	1957	1	Aerovan conversion with Hurel Dubois wing

- R.A.E. – Vickers Transonic Research Rocket. The test vehicle was a 3/10-scale model of the Miles E.24/43 design (except for the omission of the distinctive annular air intake of the full-scale aircraft). To maintain the centre of gravity it was necessary to include a large balance weight (almost 1/10 of total all-up weight) in the foremost section of the ogival nose. On 9 October 1948, model A3 (one of three craft built) was successfully launched.[25]

== Missiles ==
- Miles Hoopla – a surface-to-surface missile project, the Miles Hoopla dates from 1941 to 1943. It was a remotely piloted, high wing light aircraft carrying a 1,000 lb bomb. It was powered by a de Havilland Gipsy Queen engine with a wingspan of 14 feet, and an estimated speed of over 300 mph. It was not a "flying bomb" like the V-1, but was intended to drop its load and return for re-use. Accuracy was not a major consideration as its intended target was to be German cities. Only a mock-up was constructed before the project was cancelled.

== Legacy ==
The Miles Aircraft Collection was established in 1993 for anyone interested in Miles aircraft and related subjects and aims to encourage the preservation of all surviving examples worldwide (ideally in flying condition or otherwise in museums and collections open to the public).

== See also ==
- Aerospace industry in the United Kingdom
