= Miles Merlin =

1930s British monoplane

M.4A Merlin
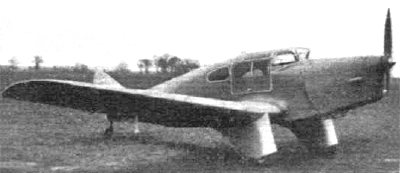

General information
- Type: Five-seat cabin monoplane
- Manufacturer: Miles Aircraft Limited
- Designer: Frederick George Miles
- Number built: 4

History
- First flight: 11 May 1935
- Developed from: Miles M.3 Falcon

The Miles M.4A Merlin was a 1930s British five-seat cabin monoplane built by Miles Aircraft Limited.

== Design and development ==
The Merlin was designed by F.G. Miles of Philips and Powis, as a result of collaboration with G. Birkett of Birkett Air Service Ltd, and Tata Sons Ltd of India. It was based on the three-seat and four-seat versions of the M.3 Falcon, but with wider fuselage and consequent increased wing span. It was a low-wing monoplane, with fixed main undercarriage in trouser fairings plus a fixed tailwheel. Construction was mainly of wood, with spruce frames and three-ply birch covering, and the wings had hydraulically operated split flaps. It was powered by a 200 hp de Havilland Gipsy Six piston engine. It was first designated M.4 Merlin, but all four examples were completed as M.4A Merlin, with fixed pitch propeller instead of the intended variable pitch unit.

== Operational history ==
On 11 May 1935, the prototype (U-8, later G-ADFE), built by Philips and Powis (Miles Aircraft), first flew at Woodley Aerodrome, piloted by F.G. Miles. A few weeks later, the Merlin was delivered to Birkett Air Service, for its air taxi and charter business based at Heston Aerodrome. Two aircraft were built and delivered to Tata Sons Ltd for its Tata Air Lines service on the Karachi-Madras route. The fourth and final Merlin was delivered to E. Chaseling of Victorian and Interstate Airways in Australia, for its Melbourne-Hay service. In 1940, the Australian Merlin was pressed into service with the Royal Australian Air Force.

== Operators ==
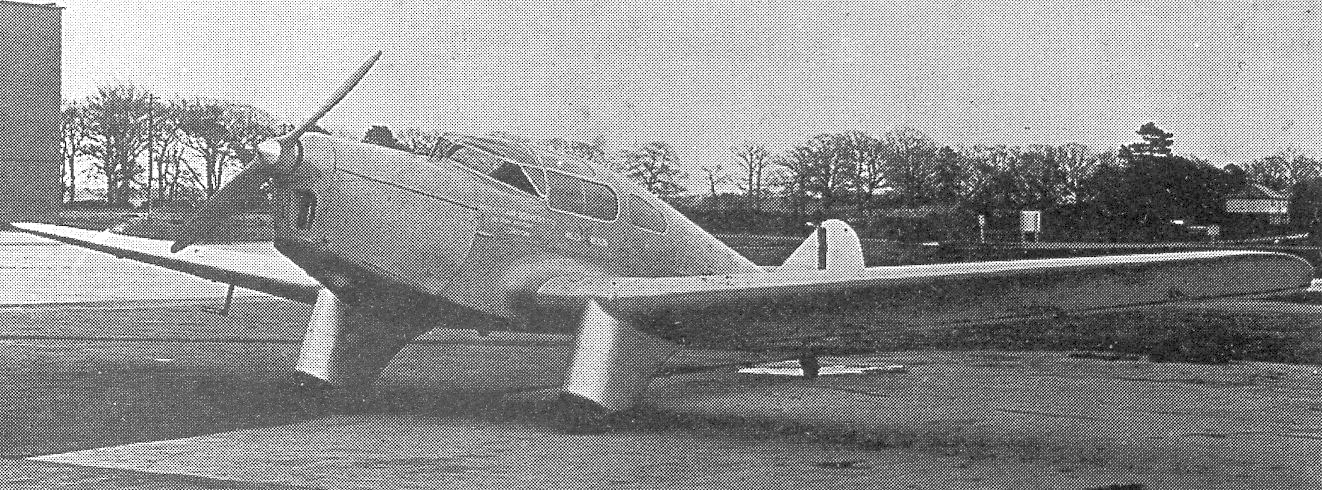

Australia

- Victoria and Interstate Airways
- Royal Australian Air Force

India

- Tata Air Lines

United Kingdom

- Birkett Air Services

== Specifications (M.4A) ==
3-view line drawing of the Miles M.4A

Data from Lukins & Russell

General characteristics

- Crew: 1
- Capacity: 4 passengers
- Length: 25 ft 10 in (7.87 m)
- Wingspan: 37 ft 0 in (11.27 m)
- Height: 9 ft 7 in (2.92 m)
- Wing area: 196 sq ft (18.21 m^{2})
- Empty weight: 1,700 lb (770 kg)
- Gross weight: 3,000 lb (1,360 kg)
- Powerplant: 1 × de Havilland Gipsy Six piston engine , 200 hp (150 kW)

Performance

- Maximum speed: 155 mph (250 km/h, 135 kn)
- Cruise speed: 145 mph (245 km/h, 126 kn)
- Range: 700 mi (1,130 km, 610 nmi)
- Service ceiling: 18,000 ft (5,490 m)
- Rate of climb: 900 ft/min (4.6 m/s)

== See also ==
- List of aircraft of the RAAF

== Bibliography ==
- Amos, Peter. and Brown, Don Lambert. Miles Aircraft Since 1925, Volume 1. Putnam, 2000. ISBN 0-85177-787-2.
- Brown, Don Lambert. Miles Aircraft Since 1925. Putnam, 1970. ISBN 0-370-00127-3.
- The Illustrated Encyclopedia of Aircraft (Part Work 1982–1985). Orbis Publishing.
- Jackson, A.J. British Civil Aircraft since 1919. Putnam, 1974. ISBN 0-370-10014-X.
- Jackson, A.J. British Civil Aircraft since 1919, Volume 3. Putnam, 1988. ISBN 0-85177-818-6.
- Lukins, A.H. and Russell, D.A. The book of Miles aircraft. Harborough 1945.
