= Miles M.30 =

Aircraft model

M.30
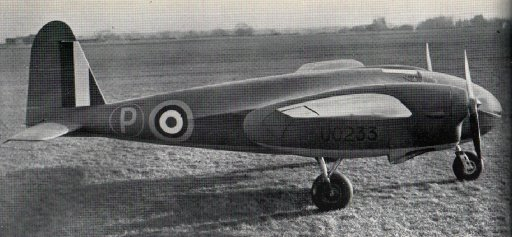
- Miles M.30 X-Minor

General information
- Type: Experimental aircraft
- National origin: United Kingdom
- Manufacturer: Miles Aircraft
- Number built: 1

History
- First flight: February 1942
- Variant: Miles M.26

The Miles M.30 X-Minor was an experimental aircraft, designed by Miles Aircraft to evaluate the characteristics of blended fuselage and wing intersections.

== Design and development ==
Begun in 1938, the X series of designs was Miles designation M.26, covering a wide range of aircraft designs from small feeder-liners to very large 8-engined transatlantic transports.

To investigate the design philosophy of the blended wing/body Miles was given a contract to design and build a sub-scale flying model of the X.9 design, which emerged as the M.30 X-Minor. The small size of the X Minor made it impossible to follow the buried engine design exactly; the engines were too large and had to be mounted externally, resulting in an aircraft similar in layout but differing in aerodynamics. The X Minor first flew in February 1942, providing Miles with useful data for several years. A larger scale prototype of the X transport was planned but never built.

== Specifications (M.30 X-Minor) ==
Data from Miles aircraft since 1925

General characteristics

- Crew: 2
- Length: 26 ft 3 in (8.00 m)
- Wingspan: 33 ft (10 m) 38 ft 6 in (11.73 m) when extended later
- Height: 9 ft (2.7 m)
- Wing area: 200 sq ft (19 m^{2})
- Aspect ratio: 5.4
- Empty weight: 2,710 lb (1,229 kg)
- Gross weight: 4,240 lb (1,923 kg)
- Powerplant: 2 × de Havilland Gipsy Major 4-cyl inverted in-line air-cooled piston engine, 130 hp (97 kW) each
- Propellers: 2-bladed fixed-pitch propellers

Performance

- Wing loading: 21.2 lb/sq ft (104 kg/m^{2})
- Power/mass: 0.0613 hp/lb

== See also ==
Aircraft of comparable role, configuration, and era

- Westland Dreadnought

Related lists

- List of aircraft of the Royal Air Force
- List of experimental aircraft
