= Miles M.64 L.R.5 =

M.64 L.R.5

General information
- Type: two seat light aircraft
- National origin: United Kingdom
- Manufacturer: Miles Aircraft Ltd.
- Designer: George Herbert Miles
- Number built: 1

History
- First flight: 3 June 1945

The Miles M.64 L.R.5 was a two-seat light aircraft, designed in the United Kingdom, for private and club use in 1944-1945.

== Design and development ==
A small band of enthusiasts at Miles' Liverpool road factory, (L.R.5 - 5th design from Liverpool Road) gained permission from George Miles to design and build a light aircraft for possible production after the end of the Second World War. Miles gave his permission and also agreed to the company supplying any materials required.

The L.R.5 emerged in 1945 as a single-engined, wooden, low-wing monoplane with a fixed tricycle undercarriage, powered by a 100 hp (75 kW) Blackburn Cirrus Minor 4-cylinder, air-cooled, inverted, in-line piston aircraft engine. The spacious side-by-side configuration cockpit was covered by a large plexiglas canopy with car-type entry doors on both sides. The undercarriage included levered sprung main legs and a steerable nosewheel.

Due to disappointing flight test results and higher priority given to established production aircraft, development of the L.R.5 was abandoned.

== Operational history ==
George Miles flew the prototype, which had been allocated the experimental registration U-0253 (later U-6), on 3 June 1945, but although flight test results were disappointing at low speeds, on take-off and landing, the L.R.5 was pleasant to fly and had excellent visibility.

== Specifications (L.R.5) ==
Data from Miles Aircraft since 1925

General characteristics

- Crew: one
- Capacity: one passenger
- Wingspan: 36 ft (11 m)
- Empty weight: 1,000 lb (454 kg)
- Gross weight: 1,550 lb (703 kg)
- Powerplant: 1 × Blackburn Cirrus Minor 4-cylinder, air-cooled, inverted, in-line piston engine, 100 hp (75 kW)

Performance

== See also ==
Aircraft of comparable role, configuration, and era

- Max Holste MH.52
- Ercoupe 415-C
