= Miles Mentor =

M.16 Mentor
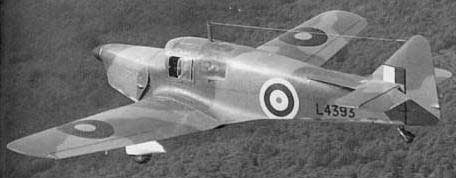

General information
- Type: Training and Communications
- Manufacturer: Miles Aircraft Limited
- Status: Withdrawn from service
- Primary user: Royal Air Force
- Number built: 45

History
- Introduction date: 1938
- First flight: 5 January 1938
- Retired: 1950
- Developed from: Miles M.7 Nighthawk

The Miles M.16 Mentor was a 1930s British single-engined three-seat monoplane training and communications aircraft built by Miles Aircraft Limited.

== Design and development ==
The origins of the Mentor can be traced back to the Air Ministry's release of Specification 38/37, which called for a three-seat cabin monoplane for use in multiple capacities, including for instrument training, radio training, and communications work during both day and night time. Amongst the requirements requested in the specification included the use of a de Havilland Gipsy Six engine, the provision of dual flying controls, instrumentation suitable for blind-flying, doors on either side of the cockpit. Upon receipt of the specification, Miles opted to produce its own response, which it largely derived from its existing Miles M.7 Nighthawk.

This aircraft, which was given the name Mentor, comprised wooden construction wherever practical. It was fitted with a single-piece windscreen made of moulded Perspex, which the company had recently pioneered on the Miles Whitney Straight. According to aviation author Don Brown, the Mentor's design process was relatively straightforward, involving only 630 man weeks within Miles' drawing office.

A prototype was produced. On 5 January 1938, this prototype (Serial L4392) conducted the type's maiden flight, piloted by H Skinner. In comparison to the preceding Nighthawk, the Mentor prototype was judged to possess inferior performance, such as being somewhat slow to respond to the controls. Despite this unfavourable comparison, the conclusion drawn from its official trials was that the aircraft was satisfactory for its purpose and Miles received an order for 45 aircraft on behalf of the Royal Air Force (RAF).

== Operational history ==
Between April 1938 and February 1939, the entire production run of the Mentor were delivered to the RAF. The type were principally flown by No. 24 Squadron, while numerous RAF station flights also few several Mentors as well.

Only a single Mentor is believed to have survived the Second World War; this aircraft (Serial L4420) was declared to be surplus to requirements and thus sold into the civil sector as G-AHKM during May 1946. On 1 April 1950, this final Mentor was destroyed by a crash at Clayhidon, Devon, thus ending all operations of the type.

== Operators ==
United Kingdom

- Royal Air Force
  - No. 24 Squadron RAF

== Specifications (Mentor) ==
Data from Miles Aircraft since 1925

General characteristics

- Crew: 2
- Length: 26 ft 1.75 in (7.9693 m)
- Wingspan: 34 ft 9.5 in (10.605 m)
- Height: 9 ft 8 in (2.95 m)
- Wing area: 181 sq ft (16.8 m^{2})
- Empty weight: 1,978 lb (897 kg)
- Gross weight: 2,710 lb (1,229 kg)
- Powerplant: 1 × de Havilland Gipsy Six six cylinder inverted air-cooled in-line piston engine, 200 hp (150 kW)

Performance

- Maximum speed: 156 mph (251 km/h, 136 kn)
- Service ceiling: 13,800 ft (4,200 m)
- Rate of climb: 780 ft/min (4.0 m/s)
- Wing loading: 15 lb/sq ft (73 kg/m^{2})

== See also ==
Related lists

- List of aircraft of the Royal Air Force
- List of aircraft of World War II
