= Armstrong Siddeley Beta =

Beta
- Country of origin: Britain
- Manufacturer: Armstrong Siddeley

Liquid-fuel engine
- Propellant: hydrogen peroxide HTP / C-fuel (57% methanol, 30% hydrazine hydrate and 13% water)
- Pumps: First British rocket with gas-generator powered turbo-pump.

Configuration
- Chamber: Double

Armstrong Siddeley Beta was an early rocket engine, intended for use in supersonic aircraft.

The Miles M.52, the intended British contender for supersonic flight, had been cancelled in 1946 due to uncertainty concerning its turbojet engine's thrust potential and the risks of crewed supersonic flight. A scale model was then built by Vickers with a 362 kg (800 lbf) thrust hydrogen peroxide 'hot' motor evolved at Westcott derived from the Walter HWK 109-509 engine. This initiated the Beta and the subsequent Delta engines. In October 1948 the Vickers Transonic model flew at 930 mph (Mach 1.5) in level flight at 35,000 ft.

To reduce the risks of single-sourced engines, other makers were given experience of work with hydrogen peroxide. In 1952 Napier were providing their NRE.17 engines for missile trials, as a line of development from Beta.

== Variants ==
- Beta II

Larger version of Beta I
