= Miles Hawcon =

M.6 Hawcon

General information
- Type: Two seat experimental monoplane
- Manufacturer: Miles Aircraft Limited
- Designer: Frederick George Miles
- Primary user: Royal Aircraft Establishment
- Number built: 1

History
- First flight: 1935

The Miles M.6 Hawcon was a 1930s British experimental monoplane designed by Miles Aircraft Limited. The Hawcon name comes from a combination of Hawk and Falcon.

== Design and development ==
The M.6 Hawcon was a one-off experimental monoplane designed for thick-wing research by the Royal Aircraft Establishment. The Hawcon combined parts from both the Hawk and Falcon and was powered by a 200 hp (149 kW) de Havilland Gipsy Six piston engine.

== Operational history ==
The aircraft, serial number K5925, was used for thick-wing research by the Royal Aircraft Establishment. It had four interchangeable wings of different thickness. The aim was to investigate the performance penalties of thicker wings, which had structural advantages (lower weight for the same strength) and provided space for fuel etc.

The four wings, labelled A to D had root thickness to chord ratios of 0.15, 0.20, 0.25 and 0.30. The trials showed that the thickness had little effect on maximum speed: wing B was faster than A by 5 m.p.h. (less than 3%) and the other wings fell between. The maximum speed given below is for the D wing, as are the dimensions and weights.

For comparison, modern low Mach number aircraft have root thickness to chord ratios of 0.14 - 0.20.

== Operators ==
United Kingdom

- Royal Aircraft Establishment

== Specifications (M.6) ==
Data from Russell & Lukins

General characteristics

- Crew: Two
- Length: 25 ft 0 in (7.6 m)
- Wingspan: 39 ft 5 in (12 m)
- Height: 6 ft 6 in (1.9 m)
- Wing area: 161 sq ft (14.6 m^{2})
- Empty weight: 1,550 lb (703 kg)
- Gross weight: 2,400 lb (1,088 kg)
- Powerplant: 1 × de Havilland Gipsy Six piston engine , 200 hp (149 kW)

Performance

- Maximum speed: 180 mph (290 km/h, 160 kn)

== See also ==
Related lists

- List of experimental aircraft
