= Miles M.52 =

1942 British supersonic jet project

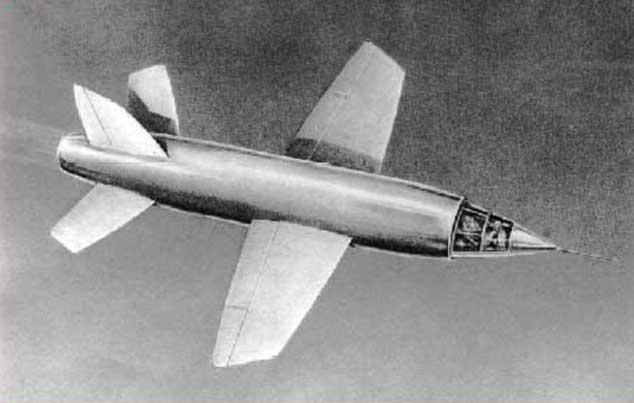
- Artist's impression of the Miles M.52

General information
- Type: Experimental supersonic aircraft
- National origin: United Kingdom
- Manufacturer: Miles Aircraft
- Designer: Don L. Brown
- Status: Cancelled
- Number built: none

The Miles M.52 was a turbojet-powered supersonic research aircraft project designed in the United Kingdom in the mid-1940s. In October 1943, Miles Aircraft was issued with a contract to produce the aircraft in accordance with Air Ministry Specification E.24/43. The programme was highly ambitious for its time, aiming to produce an aircraft capable of a speed of at least 1,000 miles per hour (1,600 km/h) during level flight, and involved a very high proportion of cutting-edge aerodynamic research and innovative design work.

Until 1945 all work on the project was undertaken with a high level of secrecy. In February 1946, the programme was terminated by the new Labour government of Clement Attlee, seemingly due to budgetary reasons as well as the disbelief of some ministry officials regarding the practicality of supersonic aircraft. In September 1946 the existence of the M.52 project was revealed to the general public, leading to criticism of the decision and calls for an official explanation of why the project had been terminated. The Ministry of Supply controversially decided to investigate the design with six different configurations of wing and control surfaces, but as a series of unmanned rocket-powered 30 per cent scale models instead of a manned full-scale aircraft. The contract was awarded to Vickers rather than Miles. The models were air-launched from a modified de Havilland Mosquito mother ship.

A model with the M52 configuration of wing and control surfaces achieved Mach 1.38 in controlled transonic and supersonic level flight, a unique achievement at that time and which provided "some validation of the aerodynamics of the M.52 upon which the model was based". Prior to the flight the decision had already been made to terminate the programme. Work on the afterburning version of the Power Jets W.B.2/700 turbojet was also cancelled, and Power Jets was incorporated into the National Gas Turbine Establishment. According to senior figures at Miles, the design and the research gained from the M.52 was shared with the American company Bell Aircraft, and that this was applied to their own Bell X-1, the experimental aircraft which broke the sound barrier.

== Development ==
=== Background ===
Prior to the Second World War, conventional wisdom throughout the majority of the aviation industry was that manned flight at supersonic speeds was next to impossible, mainly due to the apparently insurmountable issue of compressibility. During the 1930s, few researchers and aerospace engineers chose to explore the field of high-speed fluid dynamics; notable pioneers in this area were the German aerospace engineer Adolf Busemann, British physicist Sir Geoffrey Taylor, and British engine designer Sir Stanley Hooker. While Germany gave considerable attention to exploring and implementing Busemann's theories on the swept wing and its role in drag-reduction during high-speed flight, both Britain and the United States largely ignored this research. It was only by 1944 that information about the rocket-propelled Messerschmitt Me 163 and the jet-propelled Me 262, both with swept wings, caused attitudes on its merits begin to change. By then the British Air Ministry had already launched a research programme of its own.

In Autumn 1943, the Air Ministry issued Air Ministry Specification E.24/43 calling for a jet-powered research aircraft capable of flying at over 1,000 miles per hour (1,600 km/h) in level flight (over twice the existing speed record) and the ability to climb to 36,000 feet (11,000 m) in 1.5 minutes. The E.24/43 has been described as being "the most far-sighted official requirement ever to be issued by a Government department...a complete venture into the unknown with engine, airframe, and control techniques beyond anything remotely considered before". In fact, the specification had only been intended to produce a British aircraft that could match the supposed performance of an apparently existing German aircraft: the 1,000 mph (supersonic) requirement had resulted from the mistranslation of an intercepted communication which had reported that the maximum speed to have been 1,000 km/h (subsonic). This report is believed to have been referring to either the Messerschmitt Me 163A or the Me 262.

The Miles Aircraft company had its beginnings in the 1920s and had made a name for itself during the 1930s by producing affordable ranges of innovative light aircraft, perhaps the best known amongst these being the Miles Magister and Miles Master trainers, large numbers of both types seeing extensive use by the RAF for pilot training. Although the company's products were relatively low-technology aircraft, Miles had a good relationship with the Air Ministry and the Royal Aircraft Establishment (RAE), and had submitted several proposals for advanced aircraft in response to ministry specifications. Miles was invited to undertake a top-secret project to meet the requirements of Specification E.24/43. The decision to involve the company has been alleged to have been partially in order to resolve a dispute about a separated contract that allegedly had been mishandled by the Ministry of Aircraft Production; Wood states that the Minister of Aircraft Production Sir Stafford Cripps had been impressed by Miles' designs and development team and thus favoured it to meet the specification.

F. G. Miles of Miles Aircraft was summoned to the Ministry of Aircraft Production to meet Ben Lockspeiser, the director of scientific research, who outlined the difficulties and challenges involved in developing such an aircraft. The project required the highest level of secrecy throughout, Miles being responsible for the development and manufacturing of the airframe while Frank Whittle's Power Jets company developed and produced a suitable engine to equip the aircraft. For this project, Miles would cooperate with and receive assistance from the Royal Aircraft Establishment (RAE) in Farnborough and the National Physical Laboratory. On 8 October 1943, Miles received the formal go-ahead to proceed from Air Marshal Ralph Sorley, and immediately set about establishing appropriate secure facilities for the project.

=== Early development ===
Faced with limited amounts of existing relevant information from available sources upon which to base the aircraft's design, Miles turned to the field of ballistics instead. He reasoned since bullets could reach supersonic speeds, aerodynamic properties that would enable an aircraft to be capable of becoming supersonic would likely to be present amongst such shapes. In particular, as a result of studying this design data, the aircraft would have both a conical nose and very thin wings complete with sharp leading edges. This contrasted with many early jet aircraft, which had rounded noses, thick wings and hinged elevators, resulting in these aircraft having local regions of supersonic flow (critical Mach number) at relatively low flight Mach numbers; thus they were less suitable for research into high subsonic speeds (in dives) than the earlier Supermarine Spitfire with its thinner wings. In 1943, RAE tests conducted using Spitfires had proved that drag was the main factor that would need to be addressed by high-speed aircraft.

Another critical addition was the use of a power-operated stabilator, also known as the all-moving tail or flying tail, a key to supersonic flight control which contrasted with traditional elevators hinged to tailplanes (horizontal stabilizers). Conventional control surfaces became ineffective at the high subsonic speeds then being achieved by fighters in dives, due to the aerodynamic forces caused by the formation of shockwaves at the hinge and the rearward movement of the centre of pressure, which together could override the control forces that could be applied mechanically by the pilot, hindering recovery from the dive. A major impediment to early transonic flight was control reversal, the phenomenon which caused flight inputs (stick, rudder) to switch direction at high speed; it was the cause of many accidents and near-accidents. An all-flying tail is required for non-delta winged aircraft to pass through the transonic region to supersonic speeds without a loss of control. The M.52 was the first instance of this solution.

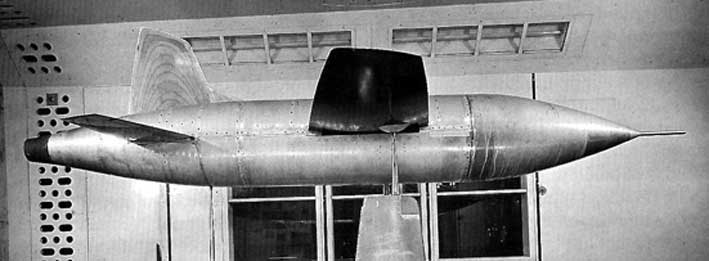
One of the Vickers models undergoing supersonic wind-tunnel testing at the Royal Aircraft Establishment (RAE) c. 1946

An initial version of the aircraft was to be test-flown using Frank Whittle's latest engine, the Power Jets W.2/700. This engine, which was estimated to be capable of providing 2,000 lb of thrust, calculated to be only capable of providing subsonic performance in level flight but when flown in a shallow dive capable of transonic flight. Wood described the engine as being "remarkable as it incorporated ideas far ahead of its time". For the M.52 to achieve supersonic speeds a higher thrust version of the W.2/700 engine would be necessary.

The extra thrust required for a fully supersonic version of the aircraft, would come from more airflow from an augmentor fan drawing air around the engine through a bypass duct and combustion of fuel in the bypass air behind the fan. These changes were estimated to provide an additional 1,620 lb of thrust at 36,000 ft and 500 mph. Much greater thrust gains were believed to be available at speeds in excess of 500 mph.

The M.52's design underwent many changes during development due to the uncertain nature of the task. The overseeing committee was concerned that the biconvex wing would not give sufficient altitude for testing the aircraft in a dive. The thin wing could have been made thicker if required, or a section added to increase the wing span. As the project progressed, an increase in total weight led to concerns that power would be insufficient; thus, the adoption of rocket assistance or extra fuel tanks were considered. Another proposed measure was that the M.52 be adapted to become a parasite aircraft, launching at high altitude from beneath a large bomber serving as a mother ship. The calculated landing speed of 160 to 170 miles per hour (260 to 270 km/h) (comparable with modern fighters but high for that time) combined with its relatively small undercarriage track was another concern; however, this arrangement was accepted.

== Design ==
In order to achieve what was at the time previously unachievable speeds a very high number of advanced features were incorporated into the design of the M.52; many of these were the result of detailed study and acquired knowledge of supersonic aerodynamics. Wood summarises the qualities of the M.52's design as possessing "all the ingredients of a high-performance aircraft of the late fifties and even some of the early sixties".

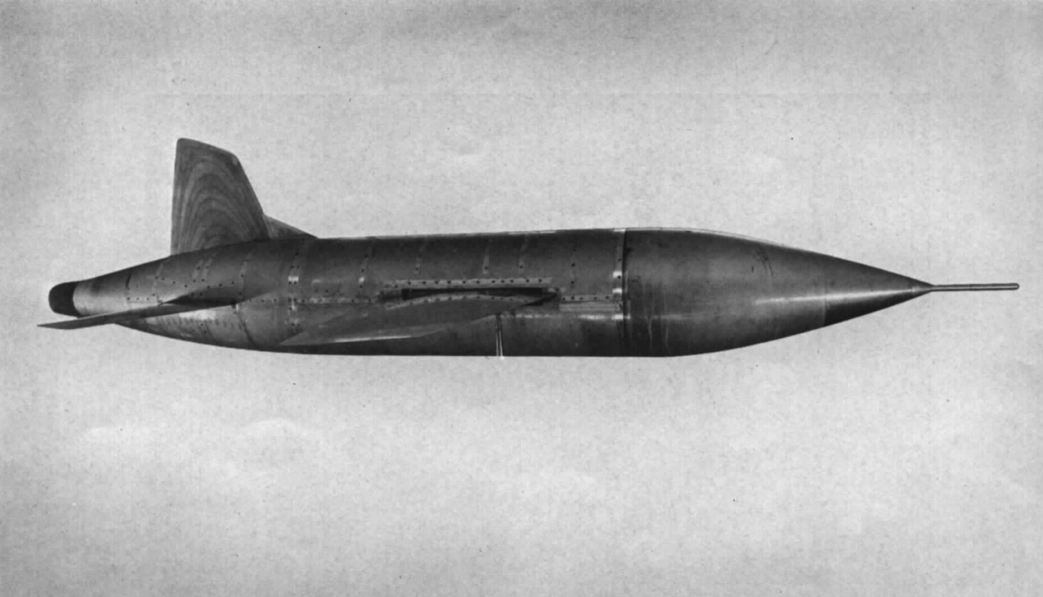
A M.52 model, around 1945–1954

The fuselage of the M.52 was cylindrical and, like the rest of the aircraft, was constructed of high tensile steel with light alloy covering. The fuselage had a 5 foot diameter with an annular fuel tank around the engine. The engine was positioned with its centre of gravity close to that of the airframe and the wings were attached to the main structure just aft of the engine. The use of a shock cone in the nose was another key design choice; the conical shockwave from the pointed nose produced a lower loss in ram pressure for the engine than a supersonic aircraft pitot intake. A retractable tricycle undercarriage was used. The nose wheel was positioned between the pilot's feet and the main wheels were accommodated within the fuselage, folding out under the wings when deployed.

The M.52 had very thin wings of biconvex section, first proposed by Jakob Ackeret, since they gave a low level of drag. These wings were so thin that they were known as 'Gillette' wings, named after the brand of razor. The wing tips were "clipped" to keep them clear of the conical shock wave which was generated by the nose of the aircraft. Both wide-chord ailerons and split-flaps were fitted to the wings. As a high-speed wing of this shape and size had not been tested before, Miles produced a full-scale wooden model of the wing for aerodynamic testing purposes; other representative portions of the aircraft, such as the tailplane, would be similarly produced and underwent low-speed flight testing.

American influence upon the design further contributed to the shape of the wings. While conventional supersonic aircraft feature swept wing designs, airframes from the US largely focused on long range and heavy payload carrying capabilities. The airfoil as well as the general shape of the wing still provided minimal drag across a variety of different speeds, lending itself useful to the design of the DARPA XS-1.

The Power Jets W.2/700 turbojet engine was intended to be the first powerplant for the M.52. Initial aircraft would have been powered by a less-capable 'interim' model of the W.2/700 and thus be limited to subsonic speeds only; it did not feature either the afterburner or the additional aft fan that were to be present on the projected more advanced version with which later-built M.52s would have been equipped. In addition to the W.2/700 engine, a centrifugal-flow jet engine, designs were prepared for the M.52 to be fitted with a variety of different engines and types of propulsion, including what would become the newer Rolls-Royce Avon axial-flow jet engine, and a liquid-fuel rocket motors.

The M.52's pilot, who for the first flight would have been the test pilot Eric Brown, would have flown the aircraft from a small pressurised cockpit which was set inside the shock cone forming the nose of the aircraft. The pilot would have had to fly the aircraft in a semi-prone position, with a curved windscreen that was aligned with the contours of the bullet-shaped nose. In the event of an emergency, the entire section could be jettisoned, the separation from the rest of aircraft being initiated by multiple cordite-based explosive bolts. Air pressure would force the detached capsule away from the fuselage and a parachute would slow its descent, then the pilot would bail out at a lower altitude. In order to serve its role as a research aircraft, the M.52 was to be equipped with comprehensive flight instrumentation, with instrument readings photographed automatically and structural strain gauge readings photographed on an oscilloscope.

== Operational history ==
=== Prototypes ===
In 1944, design work was considered 90 per cent complete and Miles was told to proceed with the construction of a total of three prototype M.52s. Later that year, the Air Ministry signed an agreement with the United States to exchange high-speed research and data. Miles Chief Aerodynamicist Dennis Bancroft stated that the Bell Aircraft company was given access to the drawings and research on the M.52; however, the U.S. reneged on the agreement and no data was forthcoming in return. Unknown to Miles, Bell had already started construction of a rocket-powered supersonic design of their own but, having adopted a conventional tail for their aircraft, were battling the problem of control. A variable-incidence tail appeared to be the most promising solution; the Miles and RAE tests supported this conclusion. Later, following the conversion of the aircraft's tail, pilot Chuck Yeager practically verified these results during his test flights, and all subsequent supersonic aircraft would either have an all-moving tailplane or a delta wing.

=== Testing ===
During 1943 a single Miles M.3B Falcon Six light aircraft, which had been previously used for wing tests by the RAE, was provided to Miles for purpose of performing low-speed flight testing work on the project. A full size wooden model of the M.52 wing, test instrumentation, and a different undercarriage were fitted to this aircraft. Owing to the wing's thinness and sharp leading and trailing edges somewhat resembling a razor blade, the aircraft was nicknamed the "Gillette Falcon". On 11 August 1944, this low-speed demonstrator performed its maiden flight. These tests found that the wing had favourable aileron function, but also indicated that landing without flaps would be more difficult than its contemporaries. Compared with a standard Falcon Six, wing area was reduced by about 12 per cent; it had the effect of increasing the landing speed by over 50 per cent from 40 to 61 mph (64 to 98 km/h), higher than any prior aircraft.

For high-speed testing, the flying tail of the M.52 was fitted to the fastest aircraft then available, a Supermarine Spitfire. RAE test pilot Eric Brown stated that he tested this aircraft successfully during October and November 1944; on one such flight, he managed to attain a recorded speed of Mach 0.86 during a dive from high altitude. The flying tail was also fitted to the "Gillette Falcon", which proceeded to conduct a series of low speed flight tests at the RAE in April 1945. decided to build their own wind tunnel, which was used to conduct the first M.52 aerodynamic tests. This required Miles to construct their own on-site small-scale foundry, due to both security requirements and also the production of components of close tolerances. By August 1945, the design of the M.52 had been firmly established and development had proceeded to an advanced stage. By early 1946, 90 per cent of the detailed design work had been finished, the component assembly programme was well underway, while the jigs and innovative augmentor fan had been manufactured; a maiden flight of the first M-52 prototype had been anticipated to occur that summer.

=== Cancellation ===
In February 1946 Miles was informed by Lockspeiser of the immediate discontinuation of the project and told to cease work on the M.52. Frank Miles later stated of this decision: "I did not know what to say or think when this extraordinary decision was sprung upon me, without warning of any kind. At our last official design meeting all members, including the Ministry and Power Jets' representatives, had been cheerful and optimistic". According to Miles, when he approached Lockspeiser for reasons behind the cancellation he was informed that it was for economic reasons; Lockspeiser also stated his belief that aeroplanes would not fly supersonically for many years and might never do so. By this point, the postwar Labour government, headed by Clement Attlee, had implemented dramatic budget cuts in various areas, which may have provided an inducement for the cancellation of the M.52, which was projected to involve considerable cost. According to Wood, "the decision not to go ahead was purely a political one made by the Attlee Government".

In February 1946, around the same time as the termination of the M.52's development, Frank Whittle resigned from Power Jets, stating that this was due to his disagreement with official policy. At the point of cancellation, the first of the three M.52s had been 82 per cent completed and it had been scheduled to commence the first test flights within only a few months. The test programme would have involved the progressive testing and development of the M.52 by the RAE, initially without reheat installed. The ultimate aim of the tests would have been to have achieved Mach 1.07 by the end of 1946.

Miles made a last ditch attempt to revive the project, submitting a proposal for a single near-complete M.52 prototype to be outfitted with a captured German rocket engine and automated controls, eliminating the requirement for a pilot to be on board. However, this proposal was rejected. Due to the project falling under the Official Secrets Act, the existence of the M.52 was unknown to the wider British public; thus, neither the nation nor the world knew that a supersonic aircraft had nearly been built, nor of its unceremonious termination. The Ministry repeatedly refused to allow Miles to hold press conferences on the M.52 and, while conducting its own press conference on the topic of high-speed flight on 18 July 1946, the Ministry made no mention of the project at all. It wasn't until September 1946 that the Ministry allowed Miles to announce the existence of the M.52 and its cancellation.

Upon the announcement of the M.52's existence, there was a huge amount of press interest in the story, who pressured the government to provide more detail on the cancellation. A spokesman for the Ministry of Supply eventually commented on the topic, suggesting that other approaches had been suggested by later research that were being pursued in place of the M.52. According to Wood, the response from the Ministry was "a complete smokescreen...it was unthinkable to admit that supersonic expertise was non-existent." Lockspeiser's role in cancelling the M.52 became public knowledge, leading to his decision being derided in the press as "Ben's blunder".

It was not until February 1955 that another official reason for the M.52's cancellation emerged; a white paper issued that month stated that "the decision was also taken in 1946 that, in light of the limited knowledge then available, the risk of attempting supersonic flight in manned aircraft was unacceptably high and that our research into the problems involved should be conducted in the first place by means of air launched models." This same paper acknowledged that the termination decision had seriously delayed the advancement of aeronautical progress by Britain. It has since been widely recognised that the cancellation of the M.52 was a major setback in British progress in the field of supersonic design.

In 1947, Miles Aircraft Ltd entered receivership and the company was subsequently re-structured; its aircraft assets including the design data for the M.52 were acquired by Handley Page.

=== Subsequent work ===
Instead of a revival of the full-scale M.52, the government decided to institute a new programme involving expendable, pilotless, rocket-propelled missiles; it was envisioned that a total of 24 flights would be performed by these models, which would explore six different wing and control surface configurations, including alternative straight wing and swept wing arrangements. Wood referred to the failure to revive the full-scale aircraft as "at one stroke Britain had opted out of the supersonic manned aircraft race". The contract for the expendable missiles was not issued to Miles but to Vickers-Armstrongs, whose design team was led by noted British engineer and inventor Barnes Wallis. While the base design work was conducted by Wallis' team, engine development was performed by the RAE itself. The product of these efforts was a 30 per cent scale radio-controlled model of the original M.52 design, powered by a single Armstrong Siddeley Beta rocket engine, fuelled by a mix of high-test peroxide.

In total, there had been an overall interval of 15 months between the termination of the manned M.52 and the emergence of the first flight-ready rocket-powered test model. As envisioned, the test model would be launched from altitude via a flying mother ship in the form of a modified de Havilland Mosquito; it was installed upon a purpose-built rack installed in between the aircraft's bomb bay doors. Shortly after launch, its onboard autopilot was to level the model out prior to the rocket motor being started. Within 70 seconds of being released, the model was envisioned to be capable of achieving a speed of Mach 1.3 (880 mph); it was then to descend into the ocean below without any chance of recovery. The acquired data on each flight was to be provided via transmitted radio telemetry, which was received by a ground station based on the Scilly Isles.

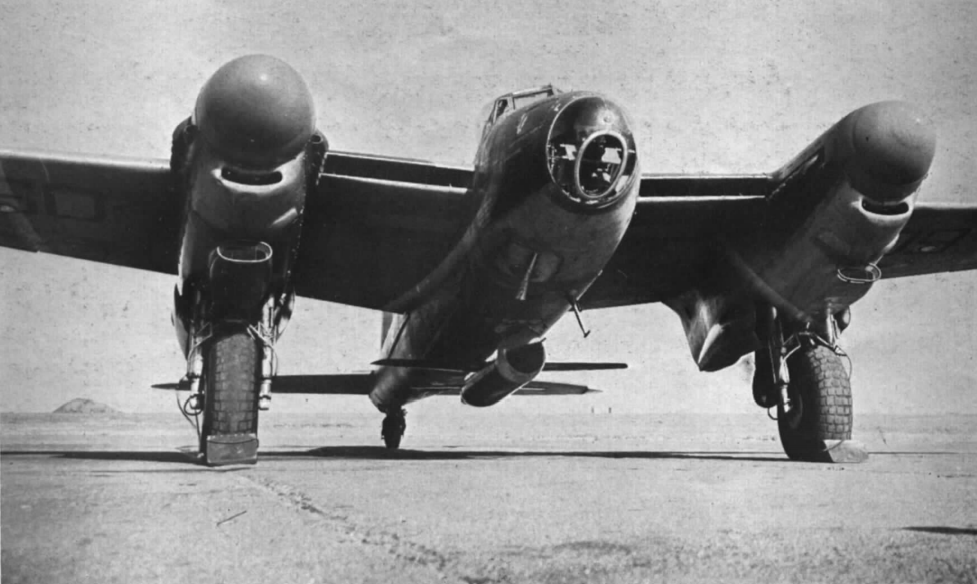
A de Havilland Mosquito on the ground with a RAE-Vickers rocket model in place below the fuselage.

On 8 October 1947, the first launch of a test model occurred from high altitude; however, the rocket unintentionally exploded shortly following its release. Only days later, on 14 October, the Bell X-1 broke the sound barrier. There was a flurry of denunciation of the government's decision to cancel the project, with the Daily Express taking up the cause for the restoration of the M.52 programme, to no effect. On 10 October 1948, a second rocket was launched, and the speed of Mach 1.38 was obtained in stable level flight, a unique achievement at that time. By this point, the X-1 and Yeager had already reached M1.45 on 25 March of that year. Instead of diving into the sea as planned, the model failed to respond to radio commands and was last observed (on radar) heading out into the Atlantic. Following that successful supersonic test flight, further work on this project was cancelled, being followed up immediately by the issue of Ministry of Supply Experimental Requirement ER.103.

One of the official reasons given for the cancellation was "the high cost for little return". Wood commented of the model programme: "with the money thus wasted the piloted M.52 could have been completed and flown and a great store of invaluable information obtained...the pilot was shown to be essential for any worthwhile development process and a well designed test-bed aircraft to be a sine qua non for full-scale knowledge".

Many important design principles that were incorporated in the M.52 did not reappear until the mid- to late 1950s, with the development of truly supersonic aircraft such as the Fairey Delta 2, and the English Electric P.1 which became the English Electric Lightning. And the X-1, D-558-2, F-100, F-101, F-102, F-104, Mig-19 etc. in the 40s and early 50s. The wing design of the M.52 was similar to the supersonic Wasserfall German rocket. Both of those aircraft were developed in response (initially) to requirement ER.103 of 1947, informed by the knowledge gained from the M.52 aircraft and missile research projects together with German experimental data.

== Specifications (M.52) ==

Data from Flight : The 1,000-m.p.h. M.52., Miles aircraft since 1925, Turbojet history and development 1930-1960

General characteristics

- Crew: 1
- Length: 28 ft 7 in (8.71 m)
- Wingspan: 27 ft (8.2 m)
- Diameter: 5 ft (1.5 m) fuselage
- Wing area: 143 sq ft (13.3 m^{2})
- Aspect ratio: 5:1
- Airfoil: bi-convex – root : 7.5% thickness; tip: 4.9% thickness
- Gross weight: 7,710 lb (3,497 kg)
- Fuel capacity: 200 imp gal (240 US gal; 910 L) / 1,600 lb (730 kg)
- Powerplant: 1 × Power Jets W.2/700 turbojet engine with augmentor fan and afterburner, 2,000 lbf (8.9 kN) thrust at sea level dry

3,200 lbf (14 kN) with afterburner for take-off
4,100 lbf (18 kN) with afterburner at 1,000 mph (870 kn; 1,600 km/h) (M1.5) and 36,000 ft (11,000 m)

Performance

== See also ==
- Sound barrier

Aircraft of comparable role, configuration, and era

- Bell X-1
- Leduc 0.10
- Silbervogel
