= Miles Monitor =

M.33 Monitor
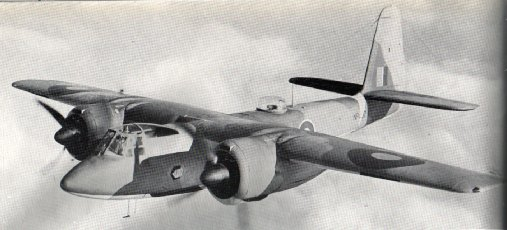

General information
- Type: Target tug
- Manufacturer: Miles Aircraft
- Primary user: None
- Number built: 22

History
- First flight: 5 April 1944

The Miles M.33 Monitor was a twin-engined British target tug aircraft designed and built by Miles Aircraft towards the end of the Second World War. Intended for use by the Royal Air Force and the Fleet Air Arm, the aircraft did not enter service with either.

== Design and development ==
The Monitor came about as a response to Specification Q9/42 for a twin-engined high-speed target tug for the Royal Air Force. The specification called for a towing speed of not less than 300 mph (480 km/h), be capable of 90 mph while streaming targets, an endurance of 3–4 hours and - most unusually - be capable of being dismantled and fitted into standard packing crates. Two prototypes were ordered; the first prototype (Serial Number NF900) first flew on 5 April 1944, and was capable of reaching 360 mph (580 km/h).

The Monitor was a high-winged aircraft with an all-metal fuselage and wooden wings. It was originally stipulated that the aircraft would incorporate the Bristol Beaufighter wing and landing gear to speed up design and production, but owing to increased demand for the Beaufighter only the landing gear was used, and a new all-wood one-piece wing was designed. The aircraft was powered by two Wright Cyclone R-2600-31 radial engines driving Hamilton Standard Hydromatic propellers. It was fitted with a novel hydraulic winch as the normal windlasses could not be used at speeds of much more than 150 mph (240 km/h), while the Monitor was required to tow targets at double this speed.

The original requirement for a target towing aircraft for the RAF was abandoned, and the orders for Monitors was taken over by the Fleet Air Arm, who required an aircraft capable of simulating dive-bombing attacks on warships. To meet this requirement the aircraft, fitted with hydraulically actuated dive brakes, nose cameras for marking Fleet gunnery, a dorsal midship cupola and radar equipment was used to accurately determine height was known as the Monitor TT Mk II. The Monitor's 10 hp (7.5 kW) winch was fitted with 6,000 ft (1,800 m) of towing cable, and was capable of towing flag and sleeve targets as well as 16 and 32 ft (4.9 and 9.8 m)-span special winged targets. Spare targets were stowed on board and could be changed in flight, while winged targets were towed off the ground on a 250 ft (76 m) line.

At the end of the war, contracts for 600 Monitors were cancelled and only 20 were built. As with all aircraft for service use, the Monitor was evaluated by the Aeroplane and Armament Experimental Establishment (A&AEE) at RAF Boscombe Down. The first received at the A&AEE (NF900) caught fire during a landing in August 1944 killing one crew member, the second prototype (NF904) made a wheels up landing at the A&AEE in August 1945, and NP409 on Intensive Flying crashed into the sea in August 1945 killing both crew. None entered service and all survivors were scrapped.

== Variants ==
Monitor TT Mk I
Prototype target tug for the Royal Air Force, one built.
Monitor TT Mk II
Target tug for the Fleet Air Arm, one prototype and 20 production aircraft.

== Specifications (TT.Mk.2) ==
Data from Miles Aircraft since 1925, The Hamlyn Concise Guide to British Aircraft of World War II.

General characteristics

- Crew: 2
- Length: 47 ft 8 in (14.53 m)
- Wingspan: 56 ft 3 in (17.15 m)
- Height: 14 ft 3 in (4.34 m)
- Wing area: 500 sq ft (46 m^{2})
- Aspect ratio: 6.3
- Airfoil: root: NACA 23021; tip: NACA 2412
- Empty weight: 15,850 lb (7,189 kg)
- Gross weight: 21,075 lb (9,559 kg)
- Fuel capacity: 480 imp gal (576 US gal; 2,182 L) fuel; 32 imp gal (38 US gal; 145 L) oil
- Powerplant: 2 × Wright R-2600-31 Twin Cyclone 14-cylinder air-cooled radial piston engines, 1,700 hp (1,300 kW) each
- Propellers: 3-bladed constant-speed propellers

Performance

- Maximum speed: 330 mph (530 km/h, 290 kn) at 15,000 ft (4,600 m)
- Cruise speed: 265 mph (426 km/h, 230 kn) at 15,000 ft (4,600 m)
- Range: 2,750 mi (4,430 km, 2,390 nmi)
- Service ceiling: 29,000 ft (8,800 m)
- Rate of climb: 2,480 ft/min (12.6 m/s)
- Time to altitude:

- 15,000 ft (4,600 m) in 6 minutes 24 seconds
- 20,000 ft (6,100 m) in 10 minutes 6 seconds

- Wing loading: 42.1 lb/sq ft (206 kg/m^{2})
- Power/mass: 0.161 hp/lb (0.265 kW/kg)
- Take-off run: 1,035 ft (315 m)
- Take-off distance to 50 ft (15 m): 2,430 ft (740 m)

== See also ==
Aircraft of comparable role, configuration, and era

- de Havilland Mosquito
- Short Sturgeon

Related lists

- List of aircraft of World War II
