= Short S.32 =

British transport monoplane

General information
- Type: Long-range transport monoplane
- National origin: United Kingdom
- Manufacturer: Short Brothers (Rochester and Bedford) Limited
- Designer: Arthur Gouge
- Number built: 3 (not completed)

The Short S.32 was a British four-engined all-metal long-range transport monoplane designed by Short Brothers to Air Ministry Specification 14/38. The project was abandoned in May 1940. If produced, it would have been one of the first British pressurised airliners.

== Development ==
In 1938 the British Air Ministry issued two specifications (14/38 and 15/38) for large transport aircraft comparable in size with the Junkers Ju 90 and Focke-Wulf Fw 200, with Specification 14/38 being for use on Empire routes and 15/38 for European routes. The Ministry placed a contract with Shorts for three prototypes designated the Short S.32 against specification 14/38 and a production order for 14 Fairey FC1s against specification 15/38.

The S.32 was a four-engined mid-wing monoplane powered by Bristol Hercules radials. The S.32 had a tailwheel landing gear to overcome problems with a nose wheel retracting into a pressurised fuselage. The build of three prototypes for the Air Ministry was started at Rochester but due to the urgent need for the factory to build the Short Stirling construction was abandoned.

== Specifications ==
Data from

General characteristics

- Capacity: 16 day passengers or 14 night passengers with alternate high density layout for 24 passengers
- Length: 89 ft 0 in (27.13 m)
- Wingspan: 127 ft 0 in (38.71 m)
- Wing area: 2,020 sq ft (188 m^{2})
- Empty weight: 39,050 lb (17,713 kg)
- Gross weight: 71,000 lb (32,205 kg)
- Fuel capacity: 3,200 imp gal (3,800 US gal; 15,000 L)
- Powerplant: 4 × Bristol Hercules radial engines, 1,250 hp (930 kW) each

Performance

- Maximum speed: 275 mph (443 km/h, 239 kn) (unpressurised)
- Cruise speed: 246 mph (396 km/h, 214 kn)
- Range: 3,420 mi (5,500 km, 2,970 nmi)

== See also ==
Aircraft of comparable role, configuration, and era

- Junkers Ju 90
- Douglas DC-4
