= Fairey FC1 =

British airliner project of the 1930s

FC1
- 3-view drawing

General information
- Type: Airliner
- National origin: United Kingdom
- Manufacturer: Fairey Aviation
- Status: Unbuilt project

The Fairey FC1 was a British airliner project of the 1930s. Although an order was placed for 14 FC1s in 1938, work was stopped by the outbreak of the Second World War, and no examples were built.

== Development and design ==
External image
- Auction catalog with a picture of an F.C.1 wind tunnel model on page 84

In 1938, the British Air Ministry, eager to encourage the development of British commercial land planes, which were seen to be lagging behind foreign designs, issued a pair of specifications for new airliners, the first, Specification 14/38 for a long-range airliner, and the second, 15/38, for a short/medium haul aircraft. Specification 14/38 was issued to Short Brothers only, who produced their S.32 design to meet it, while 15/38 was issued to a number of companies, including Fairey Aviation and General Aircraft Limited.

Fairey's proposal, the FC1, was chosen as the winner of the competition in October 1938, and an order placed for two prototypes and twelve production aircraft, to be used by British Airways Ltd. on 12 November 1938.

The FC1 was a four-engined low-winged monoplane with a pressurized cabin accommodating 26 passengers and a crew of 5. A nosewheel undercarriage was fitted and four Bristol Taurus radial engines were to power the aircraft.

To achieve long range, the aircraft was designed for efficient cruising with the engines at half power. This required careful streamlining, both for the shaping of the fuselage and also for careful surface finishing. Drag was reduced by the small size of the wings and their high wing loading of 32 lb/sq ft. This would otherwise make the aircraft difficult to handle, especially with a high landing speed, but this was countered by the new development of the Fairey-Youngman flap. The Fairey-Youngman flap was patented in 1941. These flaps were large, around 1/3rd of the wing chord. Their movement went in two phases, controlled by a linkage; firstly the flap lowered below the wing and approximately parallel, making the aircraft almost a sesquiplane. This gave improved lift, but with little extra drag, and was used for landing. The flaps could be extended further for landing, now rotating downwards to 30° as a slotted flap. With the use of flaps, wing loading was reduced to the equivalent of 25 lb/sq ft and also gave a gain in lift coefficient of around 31%. The Fairey-Youngman flap and its initial downward parallel movement was superseded for other aircraft by the Fowler flap, which too had an initial parallel movement, although rearward sliding. Fairey did use this flap design for other aircraft though, such as the Fairey Barracuda dive bomber, as the design could be modified to also tilt the extended flap upwards, acting as a dive brake.

Charles Richard Fairey is said to have spent at least £1 million out of his own pocket on the project. The project was cancelled on 17 October 1939 following the outbreak of the Second World War in September. Fairey proposed restarting the project after the end of the war in 1945, fitting more modern engines, but nothing came of the proposal.

The then Secretary of State for Air when asked in the House of Commons, questions regarding the journey from London to Singapore made by Imperial Airways, if there were any modern aircraft being constructed for Imperial Airways by which might reduce the journey time replied; "It is intended to speed up progressively the time-table of the Empire Service by an extension of night flying and also, in due course, by the construction of aircraft, prototype production orders for which have already been placed for 14 aircraft being constructed by Fairey's, for completion in 1941 or 1942, to be used on this and other routes."

== Specification (March 1939 design) ==
Data from Fairey Aircraft since 1915

General characteristics

- Capacity: 26 passengers
- Length: 82 ft 0 in (24.99 m)
- Wingspan: 105 ft 0 in (32.00 m)
- Wing area: 1,300 sq ft (120 m^{2})
- Gross weight: 42,000 lb (19,051 kg) (short haul)
- Powerplant: 4 × Bristol Taurus radial engines, 1,000 hp (750 kW) each

Performance

- Maximum speed: 275 mph (443 km/h, 239 kn) at 13,000 ft (3,970 m)
- Cruise speed: 225 mph (362 km/h, 196 kn)
- Range: 1,700 mi (2,700 km, 1,500 nmi)

== See also ==
- de Havilland Albatross
- List of Air Ministry specifications
