= Miles Falcon =

1930s British three- or four-seat cabin monoplane aircraft

M.3 Falcon
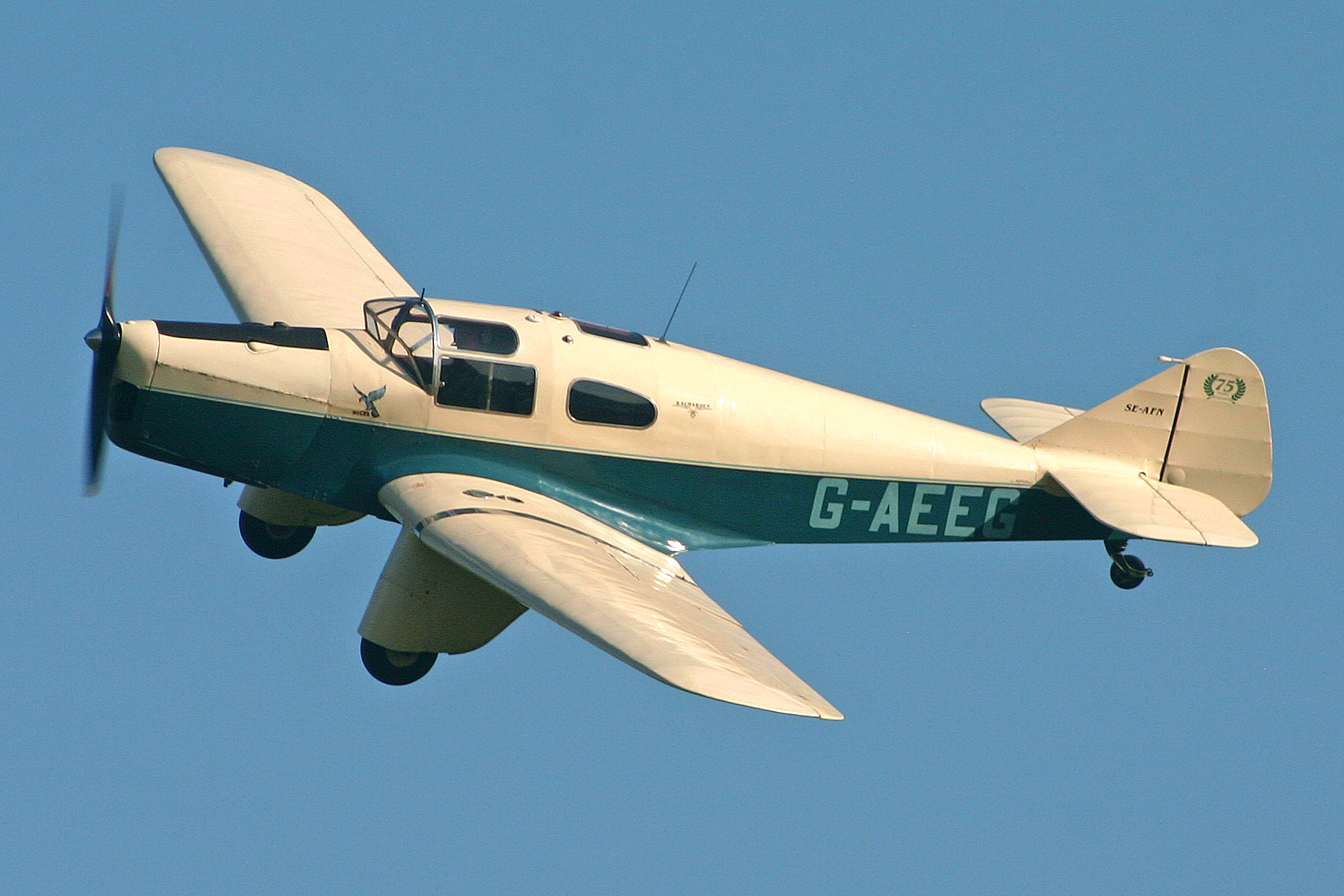
- Miles M.3A Falcon Major G-AEEG at Old Warden

General information
- Type: Cabin monoplane
- Manufacturer: Miles Aircraft Limited
- Designer: Frederick George Miles
- Number built: 36

History
- First flight: 12 October 1934
- Developed into: Miles M.4 Merlin

The Miles M.3 Falcon is a 1930s British three/four-seat cabin monoplane aircraft designed by Miles Aircraft Limited.

== Design and development ==
The M.3 Falcon was a clean, single engined low-wing monoplane with trousered main undercarriage and fixed tail-wheel, designed in 1934. It was structurally similar to the earlier Miles M.2F Hawk Major family, but had side-by-side seating for two behind the pilot in a glazed cockpit. It was powered by a 130 hp (97 kW) de Havilland Gipsy Major piston engine. The prototype, G-ACTM, built by Philips and Powis first flew at Woodley Aerodrome on 12 October 1934.

The first production aircraft (designated M.3A Falcon Major) was flown in January 1935. It had a wider fuselage than the prototype to improve passenger comfort and revised glazing with a forward sloping windscreen. The M.3A was somewhat underpowered, so the (M.3B Falcon Six) and later versions were fitted with a 200 hp (150 kW) de Havilland Gipsy Six engine.

The M.3C Falcon Six was a four seater with dual controls. The M.3D was strengthened to allow an 11% increase in all up weight compared with the M.3B. The final versions were the M.3E and M.3F.

An enlarged five-seat version was developed as the M.4 Merlin.

== Operational history ==
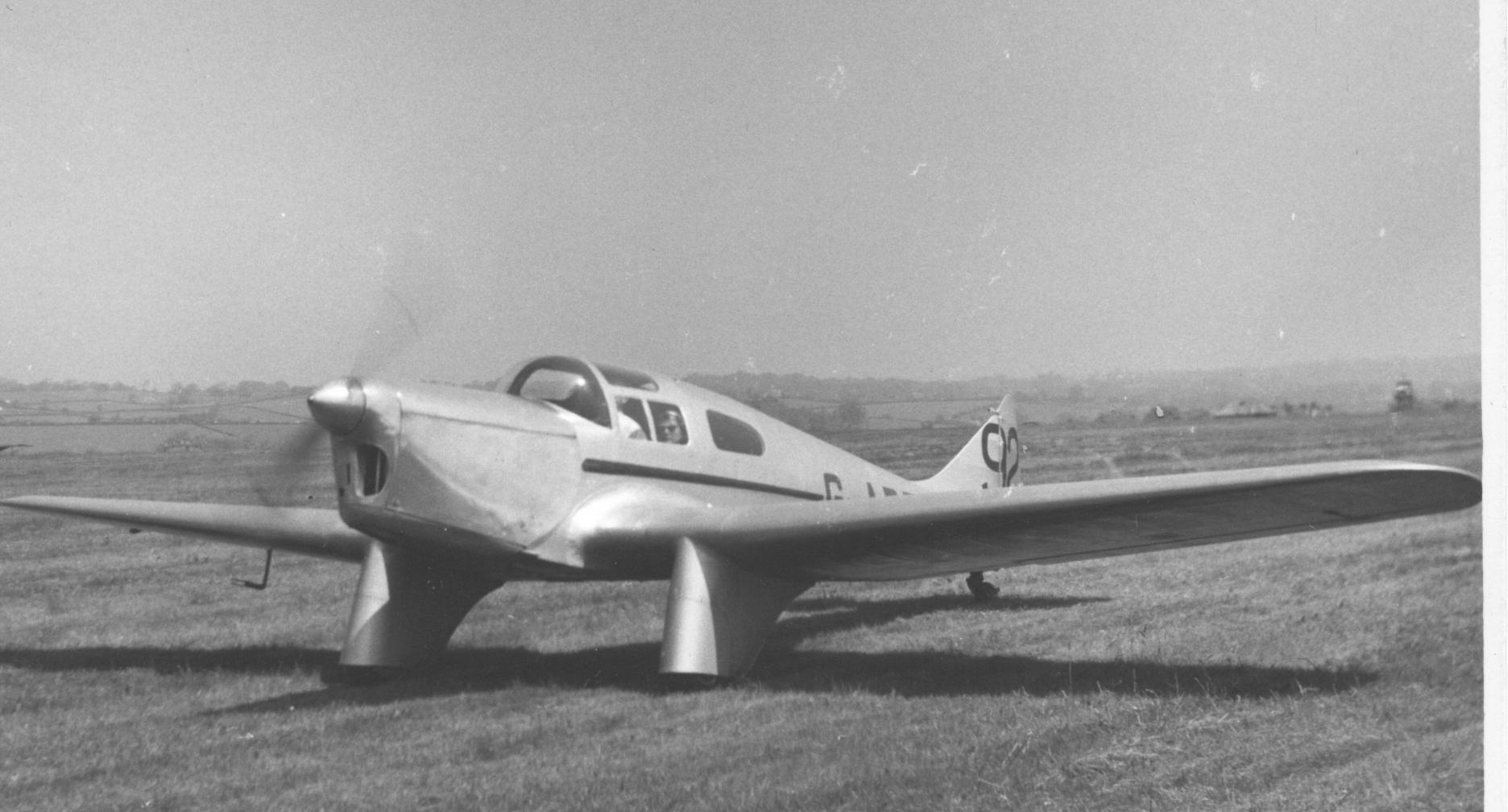
Miles M.3D Falcon Six G-ADTD wearing racing colours at Leeds (Yeadon) Airport in May 1955

The prototype was fitted with extra fuel tanks and entered into the MacRobertson Race from England to Australia in October 1934. It took 27 days to reach Darwin, but returned in a record time of 7 days 19 hours 15 minutes, including one stage of 1,800 miles (2,900 km) non-stop from Jodhpur to Basra.

Twenty-nine M.3As and M.3Bs were delivered during 1935 and 1936 to private owners, clubs, and commercial operators in Britain and abroad.

The M.3B was entered into the 1935 King's Cup Race, and piloted by Tommy Rose won with a speed of 176.28 mph (283.70 km/h). In 1936 Rose, with the same aircraft, reduced the U.K to Cape passage record to 3 days 17 hours and 38 minutes.

Pre war, three Falcon Sixes appeared in RAF garb at the Royal Aircraft Establishment (RAE) for trials of a variety of wings and aerodynamic innovations. At the outbreak of the war three aircraft remained civilian as communications aircraft with various companies but, like so many civil aircraft ten others were impressed into service by the Royal Air Force, Royal Navy, the Royal Australian Air Force and the Swedish air force. Six Falcons survived the war, one of which was used by the RAE to test the wing of the Miles M.52.

== Variants ==
Production numbers from

M.3
Prototype three-seat version with a 130 hp de Havilland Gipsy Major engine. 1 built.
M.3A Falcon Major
Production four-seat version with a 130 hp de Havilland Gipsy Major engine. 18 built
M.3B Falcon Six
Three-seat version with a 200hp de Havilland Gipsy Six engine. 11 built, including 1 Falcon Six designated M.3, but not including 2 M.3Bs later converted to M.3E and F.
M.3C Falcon Six
Four-seater with dual controls with a 200 hp de Havilland Gipsy Six engine. 1 built.
M.3D
Strengthened variant with a 200 hp de Havilland Gipsy Six engine. 3 built. One was a converted M.3B.
M.3E
Variant with a 200 hp de Havilland Gipsy Six engine. 1 built but uncertified.
M.3F
A former M.3B modified for Fairey wing, spoiler and retractable aileron trials with the RAE, R4071.
Miles Gilette Falcon
A single aircraft modified for the M.52 program.

== Civil operators ==
References 1 and 2 give detailed histories of the typically complicated lives of these small aeroplanes.

== Military operators ==
Australia

- Royal Australian Air Force 3 aircraft.

South Africa

- South African Air Force

Sweden

- Royal Swedish Air Force 1 aircraft.

United Kingdom

- Royal Aircraft Establishment 3 aircraft.
- Royal Air Force 5 aircraft.
- Royal Navy 1 aircraft.

Spain

- Spanish Republican Air Force

== Surviving aircraft ==
- In Great Britain, G-AEEG, a privately owned M.3A is owned and operated by Shipping & Airlines Ltd. and is based out of Biggin Hill Aerodrome flying regularly. It spent much of its life in Sweden as SE-AFW.
- In Australia, M.3A VH-AAT is still airworthy with a private owner, based at Lilydale, Victoria.
- In Spain, a M.3C registered EC-ACB is also active. This aircraft participated in the Spanish Civil War.
- In Australia, there’s a Miles Falcon at the Nelson Air Company in Nelson, Victoria.

== Specifications (M.3A) ==

Data from British Civil Aircraft 1919–1972: Volume III

General characteristics

- Capacity: Three
- Length: 25 ft 0 in (7.62 m)
- Wingspan: 35 ft 0 in (10.67 m)
- Height: 6 ft 6 in (1.98 m)
- Wing area: 174.3 sq ft (16.19 m^{2})
- Empty weight: 1,300 lb (590 kg)
- Gross weight: 2,200 lb (998 kg)
- Powerplant: 1 × de Havilland Gipsy Major piston engine , 130 hp (97 kW)

Performance

- Maximum speed: 145 mph (233 km/h, 126 kn)
- Cruise speed: 125 mph (201 km/h, 109 kn)
- Range: 615 mi (990 km, 534 nmi)
- Service ceiling: 15,000 ft (4,600 m)
- Rate of climb: 750 ft/min (3.8 m/s)

== See also ==
Related lists

- List of aircraft of the Royal Air Force
- List of aircraft of the Royal Australian Air Force
- List of aircraft of the Spanish Republican Air Force
