= Modular aircraft =

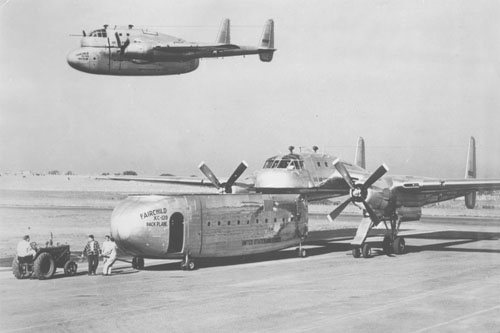
Composite image of the sole XC-120 on the ground, and in flight

A modular aircraft or pod plane is a design principle for an aircraft where the payload carrying section can be routinely detached from, and reattached to, the rest of the aircraft. It can be compared to the function of intermodal shipping containers.

One advantage of an aircraft with such a configuration is that the loading and unloading processes can be greatly accelerated; instead of emptying a plane of its payload and then reloading, the entire payload can be swapped out as a single action. This approach also allows for an aircraft to be rapidly changed between different configurations, such as to carry different cargoes, passengers, or specialised equipment payloads. So-called 'pod planes' can be divided into two main sections: the flying component that consists of the airframe, cockpit and engines; and the detachable pods, which would contain the cabin or cargo hold. The flying component and the individual capsules can be detached from each other and combined in different ways. Several experimental aircraft have flown to trial the concept, but this modular approach has remained in limited use at best through to the present day.

== History ==
=== Twentieth century ===
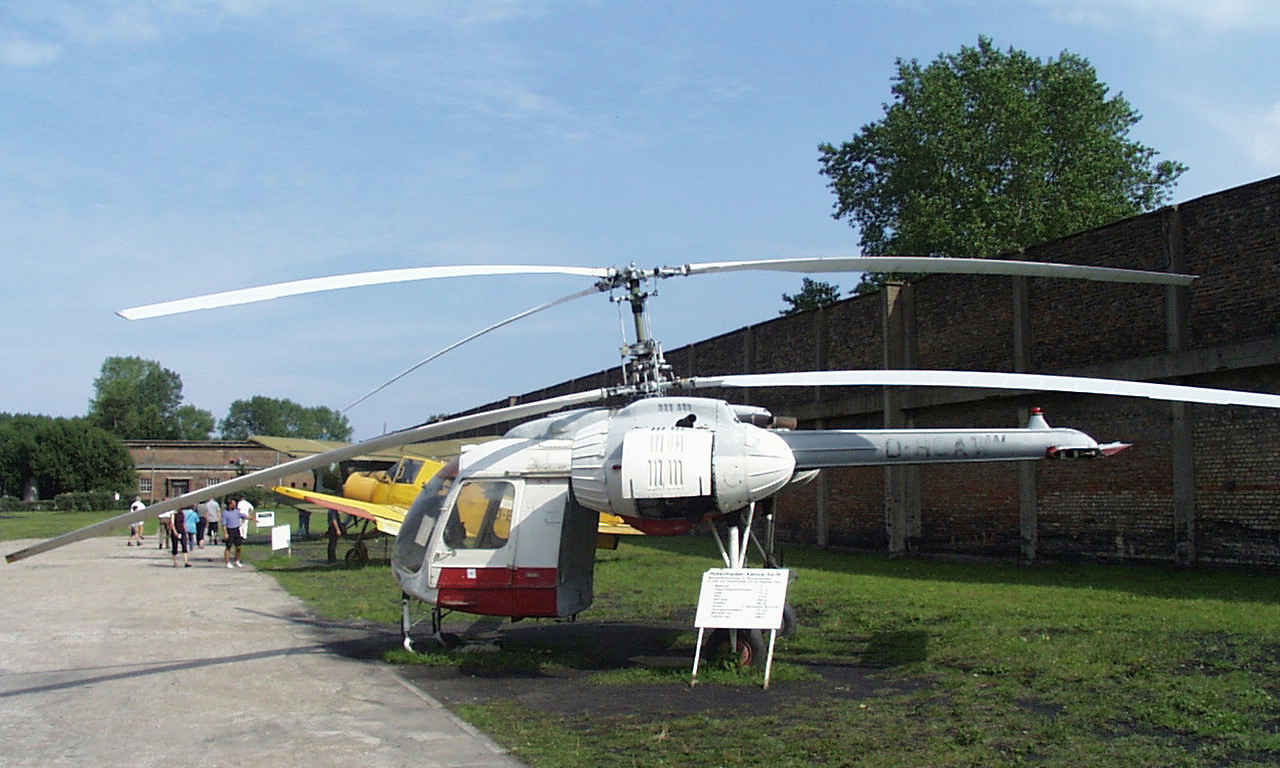
Kamov Ka-26 in aviation museum, Peenemünde, Germany

The concept was explored amid the Second World War as various nations endeavoured to improve their logistical situations through air power. In Nazi Germany, the Fieseler Fi 333 was a prototype transport aircraft developed amid the conflict that was supported by the Luftwaffe. As intended, the aircraft was to carry detachable pods of varying sizes for transporting cargo; it was believed that this arrangement was capable of allowing rapid turnaround times on the ground.

In November 1950, the Fairchild XC-120 Packplane, an experimental military transport developed for the United States Air Force, performed its maiden flight. Described as a futuristic "pod plane", it was a development of the conventional C-119 Flying Boxcar, although the aircraft underwent evaluation flights including of its logistical capabilities, the project was ultimately canceled without any further production or direct follow-on effort.

During the 1960s, the Sikorsky CH-54 Tarhe, a heavy-lift helicopter crane, could also be outfitted with exchangeable cargo pods; it was adopted in limited numbers by the United States Army and deployed during the Vietnam War for logistics purposes. NASA also made some use of the type. The CH-54 Tarhe would serve as the basis for the Sikorsky S-64 Skycrane.

Around the same period, work begun on the Kamov Ka-26, a Soviet helicopter furnished with an interchangeable modular pod. It was designed to carry a passenger module capable of seating up to 7 passengers when fitted, or two stretcher-bound patients and two seated patients with a medical attendant; in a cargo capacity, up to 900 kg (1,984 lb) of physical goods or liquid chemicals could be conveyed. The platform was capable of crop dusting with the appropriate module installed, and could also carry underslung payloads. The Ka-26 was succeeded by multiple derivatives, including the Ka-126 and Ka-226, although these rotorcraft were relatively conventional and did not pursue a modular philosophy.

=== Twenty-first century ===
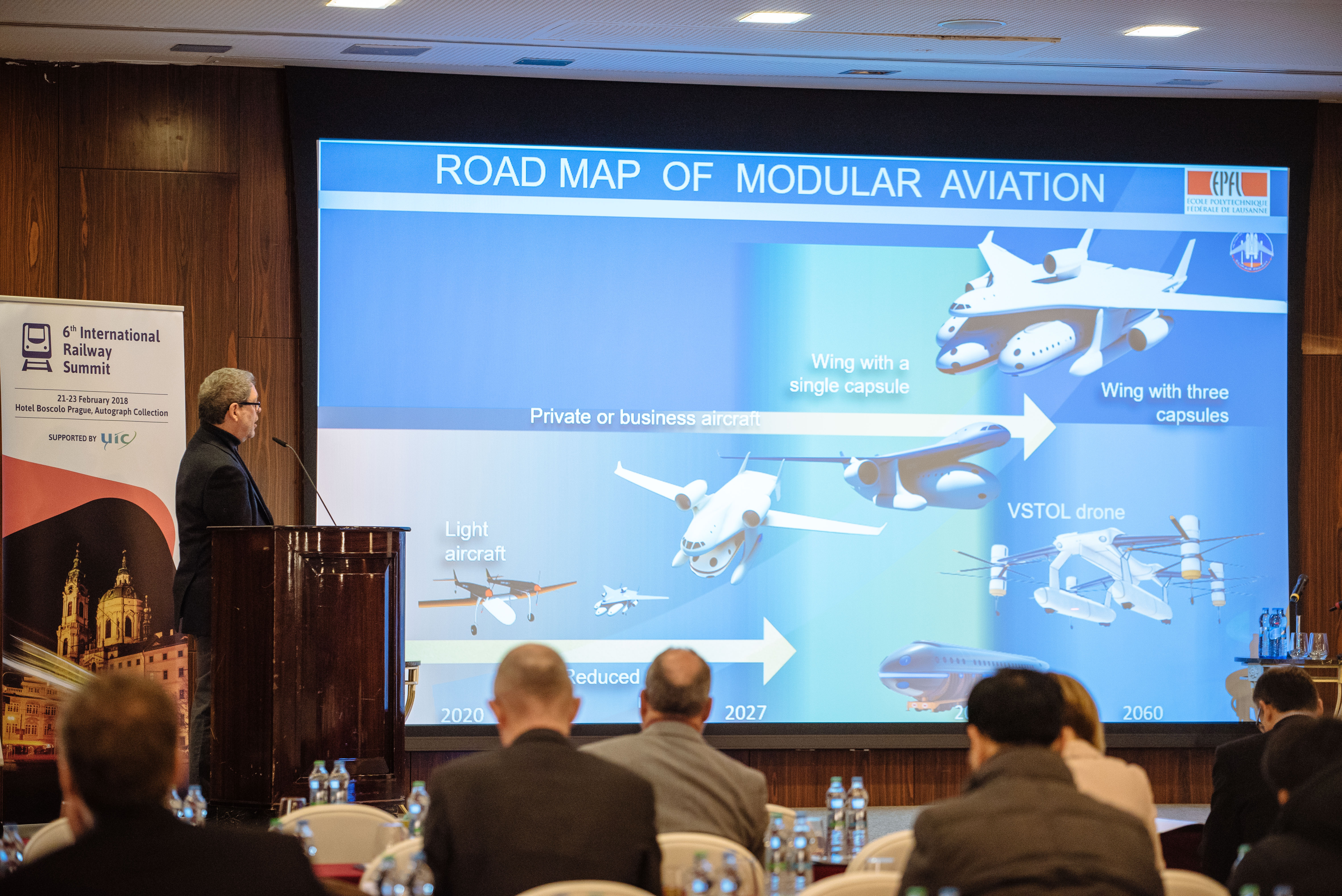
Clip-Air's Project Manager Claudio Leonardi presenting the air/rail transport system on 23 February 2018

During the 2000s, the Air Force Research Laboratory proposed a similar concept for military and civilian use in the configurable air transport: a blended wing body aircraft with multiple detachable, ground-mobile pods. The AFRL also performed proof-of-concept demonstrations under its Modular Aircraft Support System (MASS) program, which aimed at reducing the deployment footprint and increase supportability levels for aerospace ground equipment.

Since 2009, the Clip-Air has been proposed by the École Polytechnique Fédérale de Lausanne. In terms of its basic configuration, it consists of a 60 m wide flying wing that includes the cockpit, engines and fuel; the aircraft is envisioned to lift up to three 30 m long, 30 tons modules for freight, fuel or 150 passengers.

The Airbus A³ Vahana was an electric-powered eight-propeller VTOL personal air vehicle prototype. The vehicle employed a modular cabin concept, known as Transpose, which was promoted as, amongst other benefits, allowing for new entertainment and commercial modules to be rapidly installed and removed from aircraft dependent on demand. The Transpose modular design is reportedly compatible with the Airbus A320 family of narrowbody airliners, and can be provisioned at customer preference following the completion of a two year certification programme.

During 2017, Akka Technologies proposed its own modular aircraft concept. Around the same time, the Carpinteria, California-startup Dorsal Aircraft promoted its efforts to produce light standard ISO containers part of its unmanned freighter structure where the wing, engines and tail are attached to a dorsal spine fuselage. Interconnecting 5–50 ft (1.5–15.2 m) long aluminum containers carry the flight loads, aiming to lower overseas airfreight costs by 60%, and plan to convert a C-130H with the help of Wagner Aeronautical of San Diego, experienced in passenger-to-cargo conversions.

== See also ==
- Flying tank, conceptualised in the early 1930s
- Fieseler Fi 333 (World War II), design studies only
- Savoia-Marchetti SM.105, post-World War II Italian project with detachable fuselage
- Miles M.68 Boxcar
- Fairchild XC-120 Packplane (1950), one prototype flown
- Sikorsky CH-54 Tarhe (1962), heavy-lift helicopter crane, also used with exchangeable cargo pods
- Kamov Ka-26 (1965), a piston light helicopter with a modular pod, succeeded by the single turbine Ka-126 (1988) and the twin-turbine Ka-226 (1997)
