= Miles Merchantman =

Merchantman

General information
- Type: Airliner and freighter
- National origin: United Kingdom
- Manufacturer: Miles Aircraft Ltd
- Number built: 1

History
- First flight: August 1947
- Retired: 1948
- Developed from: Miles Aerovan

The Miles Merchantman was a scaled-up and four-engined development of the Miles Aerovan light freighter. It flew in 1947 but the design was abandoned when Miles Aircraft was taken over by Handley Page in 1948.

== Design and development ==
The Miles M.71 Merchantman was intended to follow the successful Aerovan freighter as a larger aircraft built along similar lines. Miles aimed to provide a simple, sturdy high-wing monoplane with an easily accessible and configurable cargo or passenger space. This was achieved, as in the Aerovan by mounting the tail unit on a boom from the fuselage top, making access via the rear of the fuselage straightforward. Intended for greater loads the Merchantman was bigger, heavier and more powerful than its predecessor: its span was larger by a factor of 1.33, all up weight by 2.2 and power by 3.2.

Unlike the Aerovan the Merchantman was intended to be a largely all-metal-framed aircraft, though the first prototype and only example built had wooden tail surfaces for speed of construction. The wing trailing edges behind the rear spar were fabric covered. The inner part of this trailing edge carried the usual Miles type flaps, hinged below the wings; the ailerons on the outer sections were, unusually, mounted below the wing in the same way. The benefits of this latter mounting were that they could act as flaps as well as ailerons, drooping when the flaps were lowered; and that, mounted in the lower wing airstream they produced less adverse yaw than a conventional aileron. The overall effect was rather like the Junkers "second wing", familiar from the Ju 52. The Merchantman's extra power came from both the number and choice of engines: it had four 250 hp (187 kW) de Havilland Gipsy Queen inverted inline motors. These were mounted in long cowlings on the underside of the wing, with fuel tanks behind the engine firewall.

The Merchantman had a similar boom mounted tail to the Aerovan, with an almost straight leading edge to the horizontal stabiliser, carrying elevators with trim tabs on a strongly tapered trailing edge. There were three vertical surfaces, one central with a rudder and two endplate fins with large moveable surfaces that acted as trim tabs. The outer fins had the same shape found on many Miles aircraft: symmetrical and elliptical at the top but blunted below. The Aerovan's central fin was semi-elliptical, but the initial arrangement on the Merchantman continued the ellipse below the boom. This form was changed quite soon after the first flight tests, when a dorsal fin above the boom replaced the lower surface.

The flat-sided fuselage did present a large keel area to be compensated by the fins. On the other hand, it produced a large uncluttered space that could be readily accessed via rear doors that included an integral ramp to the fuselage floor. It had a volume of 780 cu ft (22.1 m^{3}) and the aircraft could carry loads of up to 5000 lbs (2,268 kg). Configured as a passenger aircraft, this space could seat twenty in five rows of four, though there is no record that seats were installed. It had a tricycle undercarriage with stub axles mounted under the fuselage floor carrying short legs that bore a pair of small fixed main wheels, keeping the aircraft close to the ground for loading; the fuselage floor was only 2 ft (610 mm) above the ground. The nosewheel was steerable via the rudder bar as in the Aerovan.

The Merchantman first flew in mid-August 1947, appearing at the 1947 SBAC show at Radlett the following month with its new fin. Only one was built, registered as G-AILF and flown under B class conditions as U-21 at least as late as November 1947. Miles Aircraft ceased trading in 1947 and their assets were taken over by Handley Page; the Merchantman was scrapped in 1948. The wing of the Merchantman and the Marathon had much in common and so the former survived for a time.

== Specifications ==
Data from Jackson 1960, p. 390

General characteristics

- Crew: 1
- Capacity: 20 passengers when configured as airliner
- Length: 42 ft 9 in (13.03 m)
- Wingspan: 66 ft 6 in (20.27 m)
- Height: 14 ft 0 in (4.24 m)
- Wing area: 600 sq ft (55.74 m^{2}) gross
- Gross weight: 13,000 lb (5,897 kg)
- Powerplant: 4 × de Havilland Gipsy Queen 30 six-cylinder inverted inline air-cooled, 250 hp (187 kW) each

Performance

- Maximum speed: 163 mph (262 km/h, 142 kn) at sea level
- Cruise speed: 143 mph (230 km/h, 124 kn) at 5,000 ft (1,525 m) and 65% take-off power
- Range: 860 mi (1,384 km, 750 nmi) at 5,000 ft (1,525 m) and 65% take-off power
- Service ceiling: 16,000 ft (4,877 m)

== See also ==
Related development

- Miles Aerovan
- Miles M.68
