= C128 =

C128 may refer to:

- Commodore 128, a home / personal computer
- a production designation for the XC-120 Packplane aircraft
