= Short SC.7 Skyvan =

1963 transport aircraft family by Short Brothers

SC.7 Skyvan
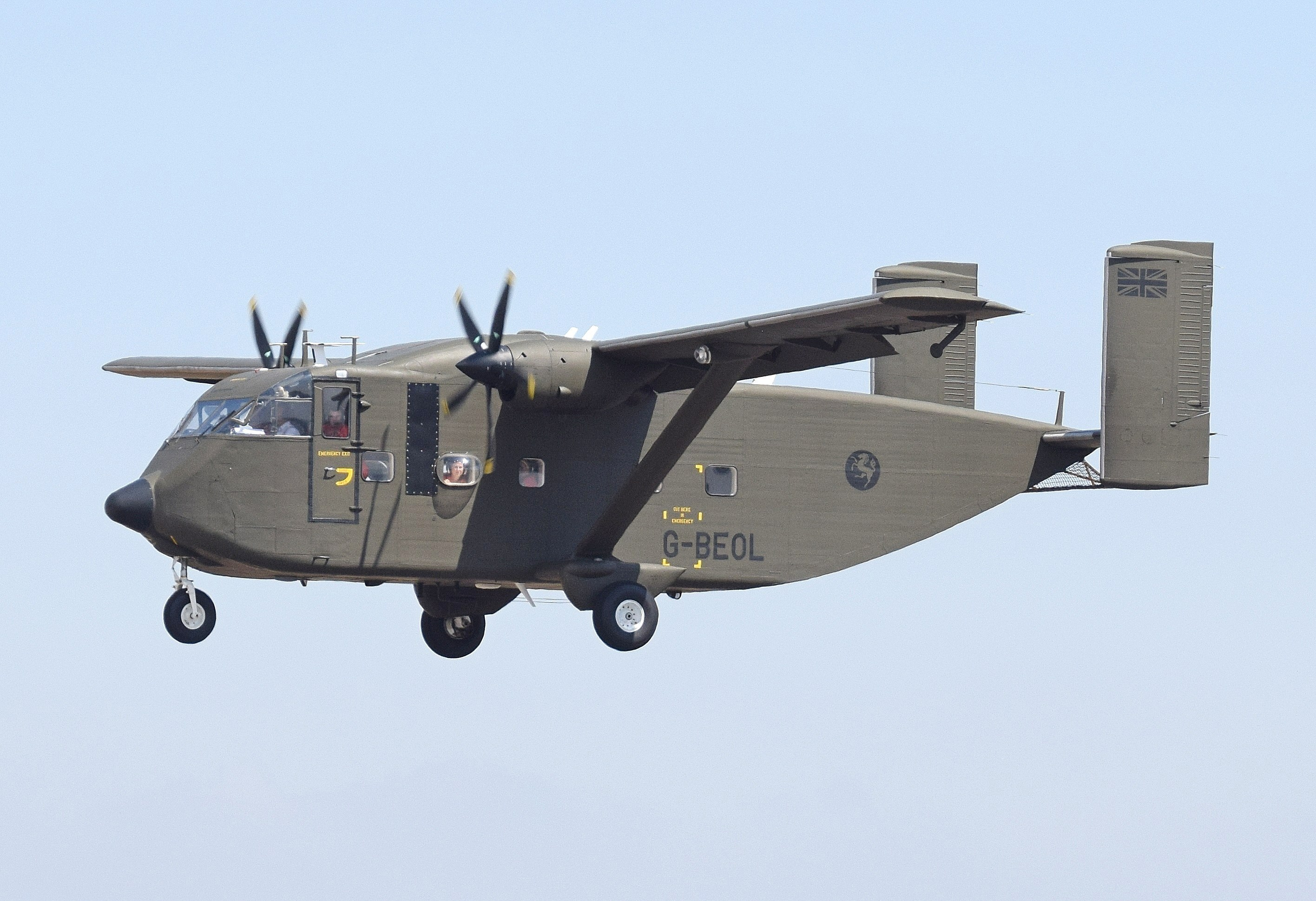
- Skyvan at RAF Fairford, England, 2018

General information
- Type: Utility aircraft
- National origin: United Kingdom
- Manufacturer: Short Brothers
- Status: In limited service
- Number built: 149

History
- Manufactured: 1963-1986
- First flight: 17 January 1963
- Developed into: Short 330; Short 360; C-23 Sherpa

The Short SC.7 Skyvan (nicknamed the "Flying Shoebox") is a British 19-seat twin-turboprop aircraft first flown in 1963, that was manufactured by Short Brothers of Belfast, Northern Ireland. Featuring a basic rugged design and STOL capabilities, it was used in small numbers by airlines, and also by some smaller air forces. In more recent years the remaining examples were mostly used for short-haul freight and skydiving.

The Short 330 and Short 360 are regional airliners developed from the original SC.7.

== Design and development ==
In 1958, Short was approached by F.G. Miles Ltd (successor company to Miles Aircraft) which was seeking backing to produce a development of the Hurel-Dubois Miles HDM.106 Caravan design with a high aspect ratio wing similar to that of the Hurel-Dubois HD.31. Short acquired the design and data gathered from trials of the Miles Aerovan based HDM.105 prototype. After evaluating the Miles proposal, Short rejected the Caravan. They developed their own design for a utility all-metal aircraft which was called the Short SC.7 Skyvan. The Skyvan is a twin-engined all-metal, high-wing monoplane, with a braced, high aspect ratio wing, and an unpressurised, square-section fuselage with twin fins and rudders. It was popular with freight operators compared to other small aircraft because of its large rear door for loading and unloading freight. Its fuselage resembles the shape of a railroad boxcar for simplicity and efficiency.

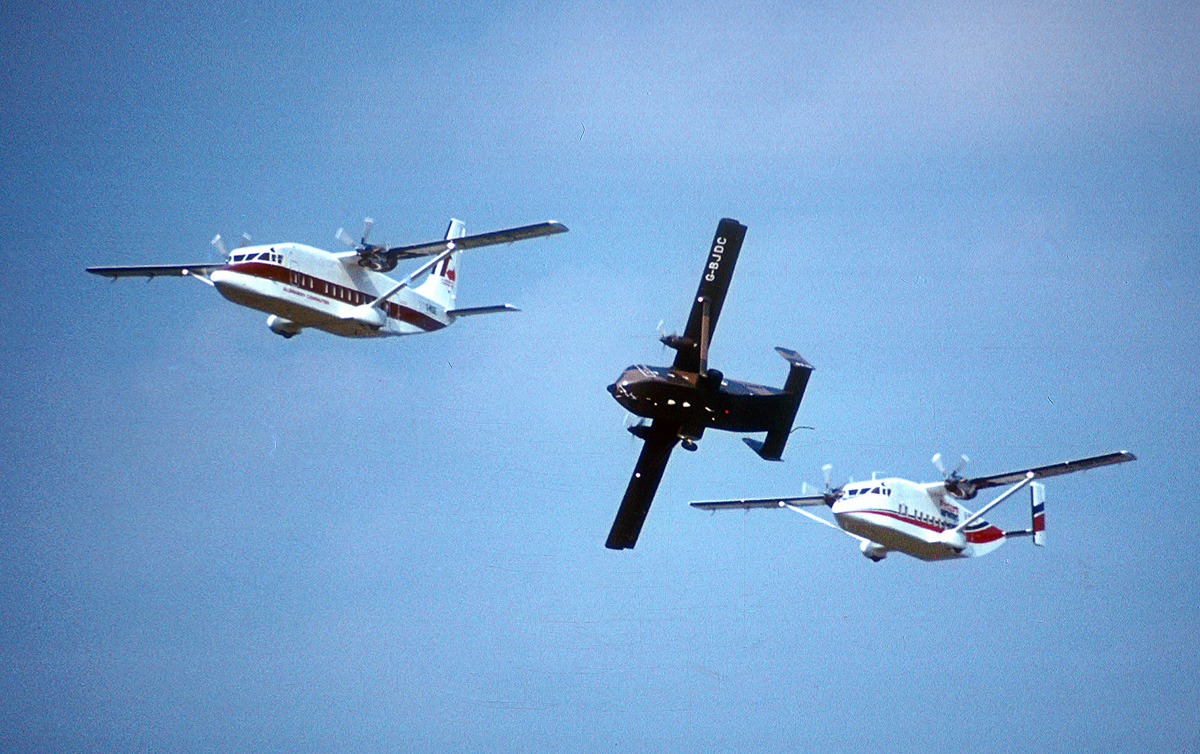
A Short Skyvan (centre) together with the two types developed from it, Short 360 (front) and Short 330 (rear) at 1982 Farnborough Airshow

Construction started at Sydenham Airport in 1960, and the first prototype first flew on 17 January 1963, powered by two Continental piston engines. Later in 1963, the prototype was re-engined with the intended Turbomeca Astazou II turboprop engines of 520 shp (390 kW); the second prototype (the first Series 2 Skyvan) was initially fitted with Turbomeca Astazou X turboprop engines of 666 shp (497 kW) but subsequently the initial production version was powered by Turbomeca Astazou XII turboprop engines of 690 shp (510 kW). In 1967, it was found that the Astazou XII was temperature limited at high altitudes. Consequently, in 1968, production switched to the Skyvan Series 3 aircraft, which replaced the Astazou engines with Garrett AiResearch TPE331 turboprops of 715 shp (533 kW). A total of 149 Skyvans (including the two prototypes) were produced before production ended in 1986.

== Operational history ==
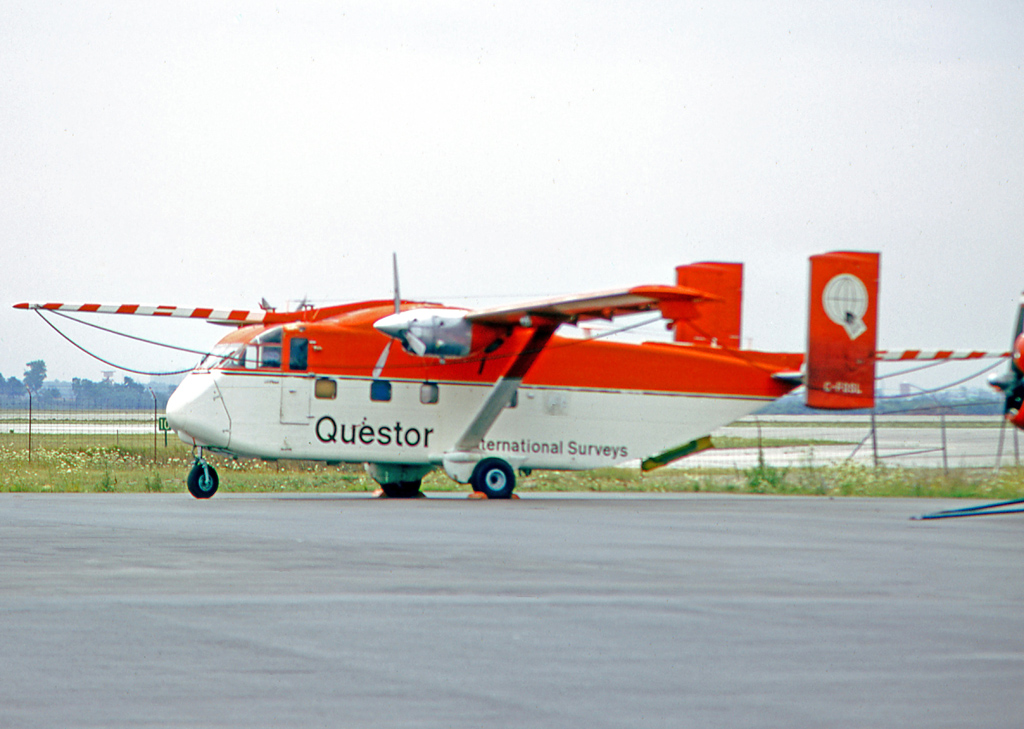
Skyvan 3 converted for survey work by Questor Surveys, 1975

Skyvans served widely in both military and civilian operations, and the type remained in service in 2009 with a number of civilian operators, and in military service in Guyana and Oman.

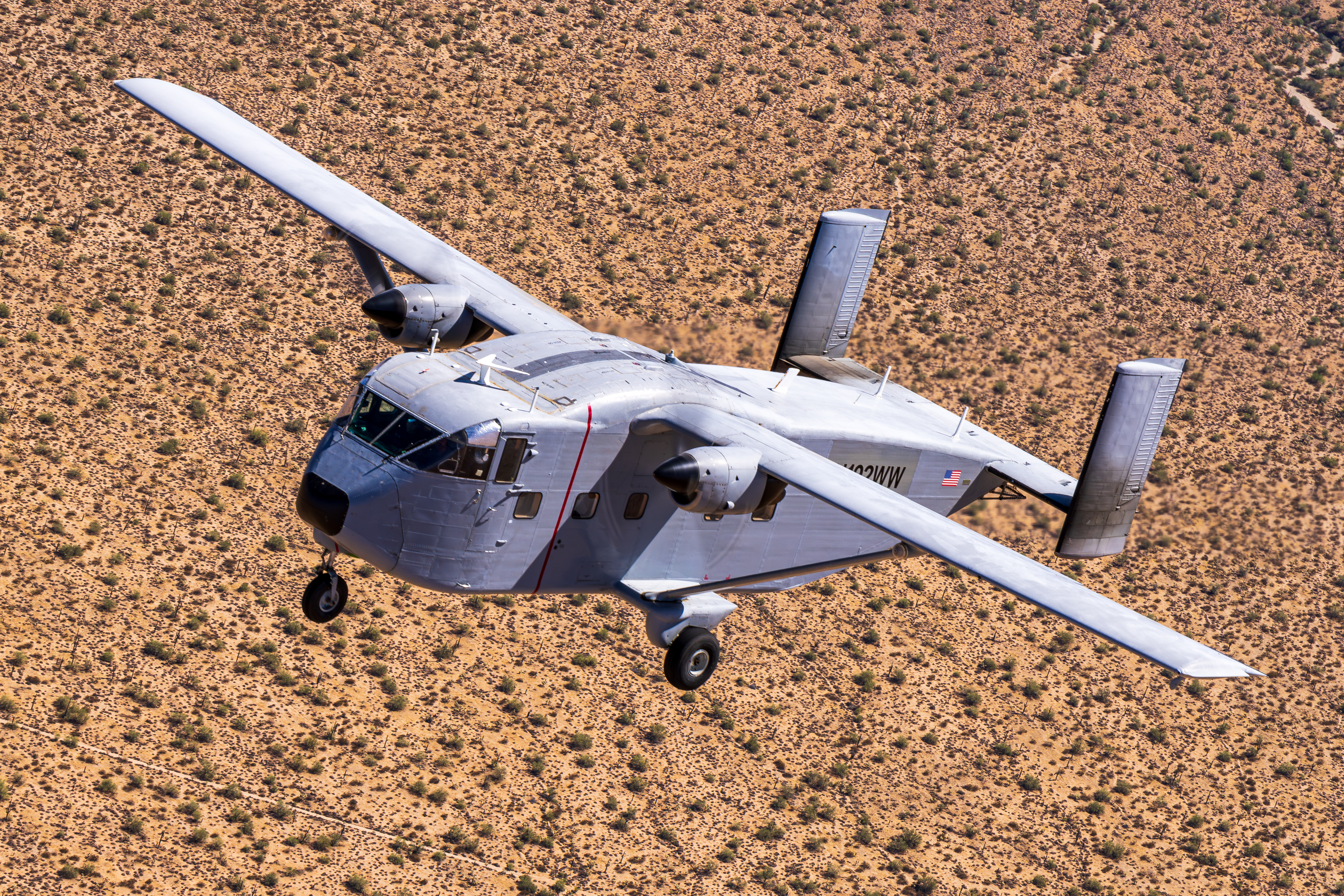
N192WW, a Skyvan operated as an air-to-air camera platform, over Arizona in 2023

Skyvans continue to be used in limited numbers for air-to-air photography and for skydiving operations. In 1970, Questor Surveys of Toronto Canada converted the first of two Skyvan 3s for aerial geological survey work. The Collier Mosquito Control District uses Skyvans for aerial spraying. NASA operated a single Skyvan at Wallops Island Flight Facility between 1979 and 1995, which was used to perform aerial recovery of parachute-borne payloads ejected from high-altitude balloons and sounding rockets.

Skyvan G-BEOL appeared in the film Kingsmen: The Secret Service as the aircraft trainee kingsmen skydived from. N194WW appeared in Season 1 Episode 4 of the TV show Narcos: Mexico.

== Variants ==
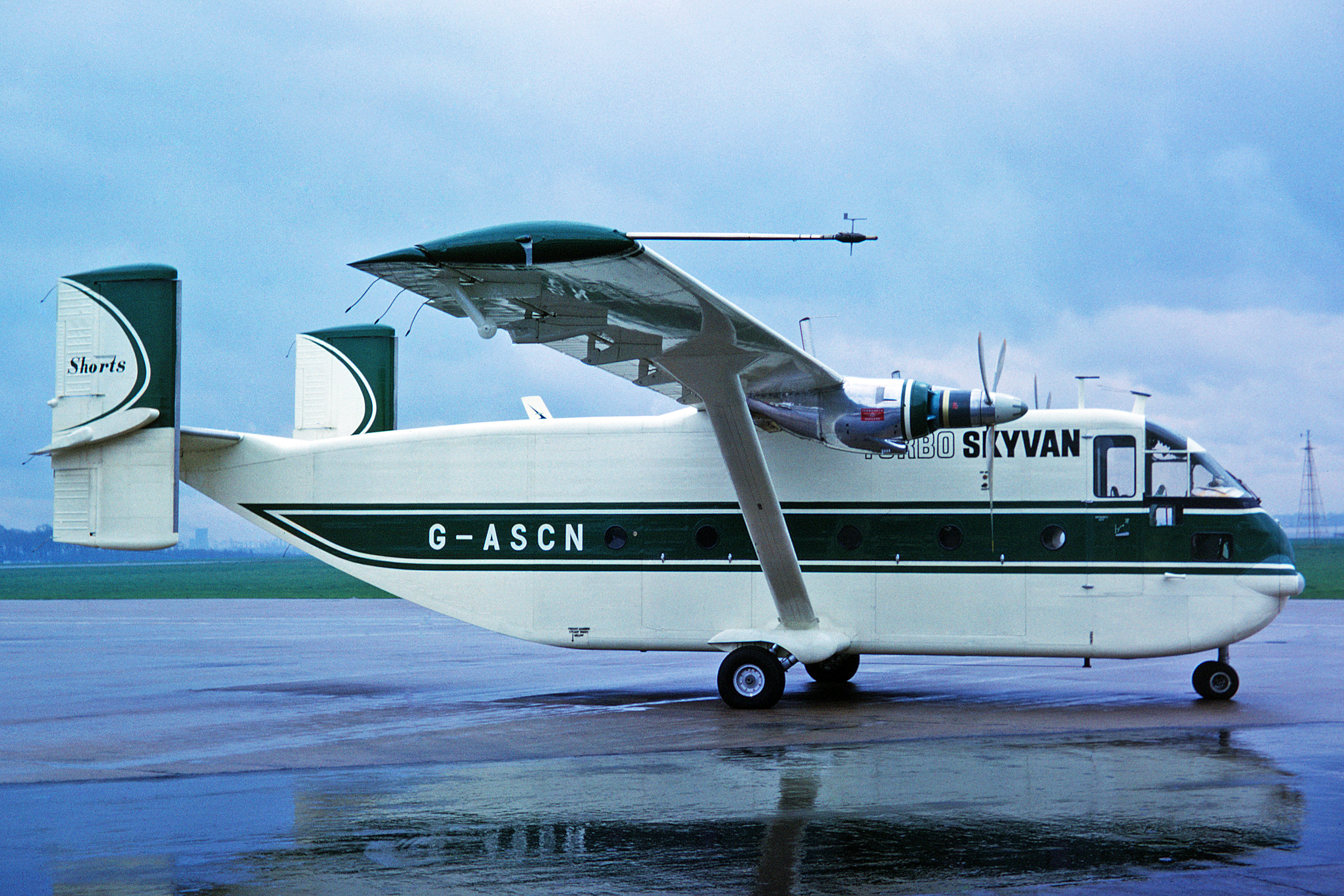
G-ASCN Shorts SC.7 Skyvan 1A prototype with Turbomeca Astazou engines, 28 April 1964

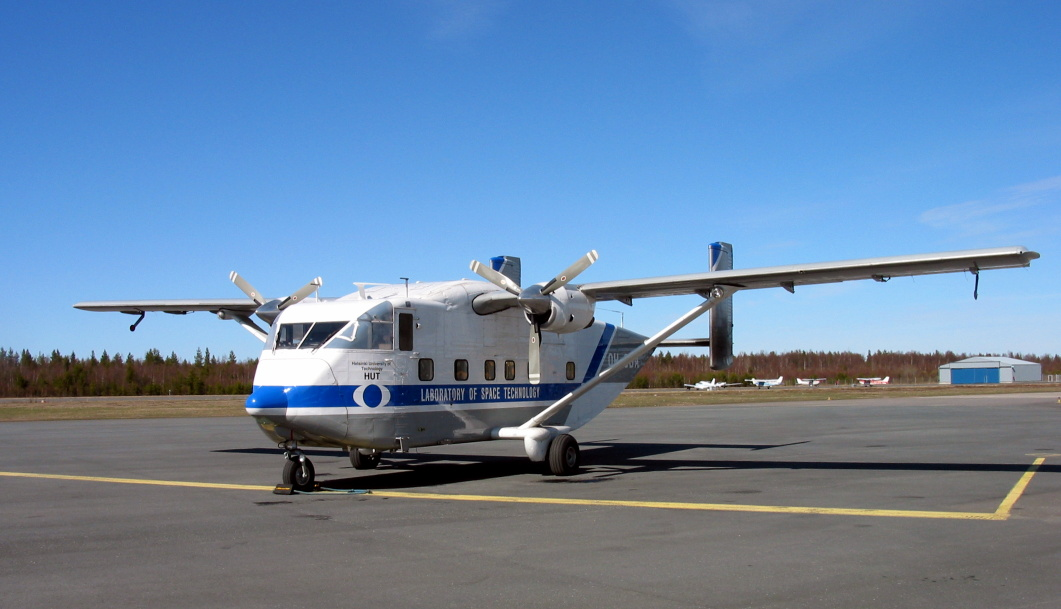
SC.7 Skyvan 3A-100 at Oulu Airport, Finland in 2005

Skyvan 1
prototype, one built. 2 × Continental GTSIO-520 engines.
Skyvan 1A
re-engined 1st prototype. 2 × 388 kW (520 hp) Turbomeca Astazou II engines.
Skyvan 2
Turbomeca Astazou powered production. 8 Series 2 produced (including the second prototype).
Skyvan 3
Garrett TPE331 powered production. 140 produced (of all Series 3 versions) plus 2 Series 2 were converted.
Skyvan 3A
higher gross weight version (MTOW 6,214 kg, 13,700 lb).
Skyvan 3M-100, -200, -400
military transport versions with higher gross weights; 3M-200 (MTOW 6,804 kg, 15,000 lb); 3M-400 as per Skyvan 3A. Used for supply dropping, assault transport, dropping paratroops, troop transport, cargo transport, casualty evacuation, plus search and rescue missions.
Skyliner 3A-100
deluxe all-passenger version, large cargo door removed, cabin accessed through standard size side door.
Seavan
Maritime patrol version, single example (serial '915', SH.1942) used by the Sultan of Oman's Air Force / Royal Air Force of Oman (SOAF / RAFO) (conversion from basic 3M-400)

== Operators ==
=== Civilian operators ===
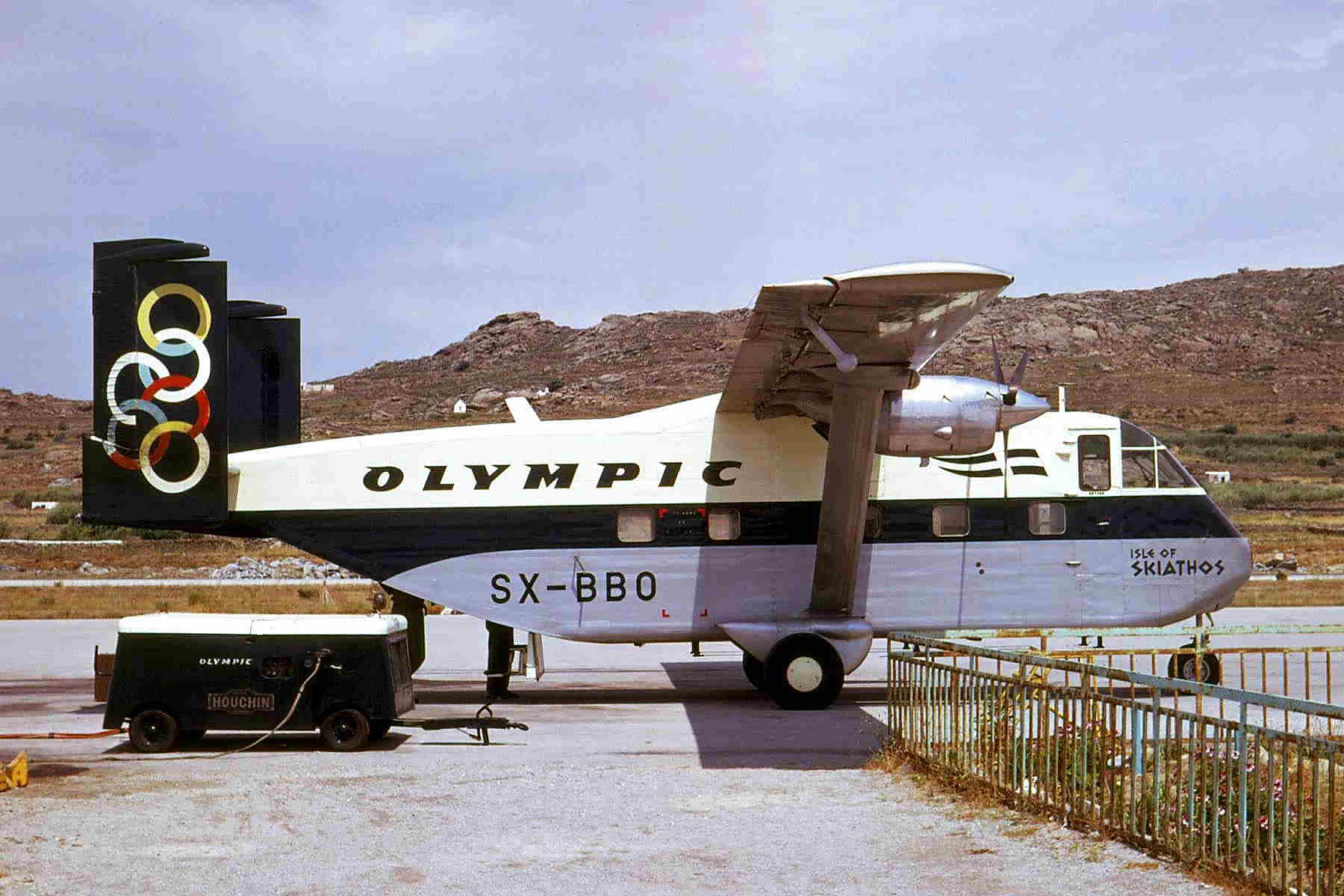
SX-BBO SC.7 Skyvan 400 Olympic Airways at Mykonos ca 1975

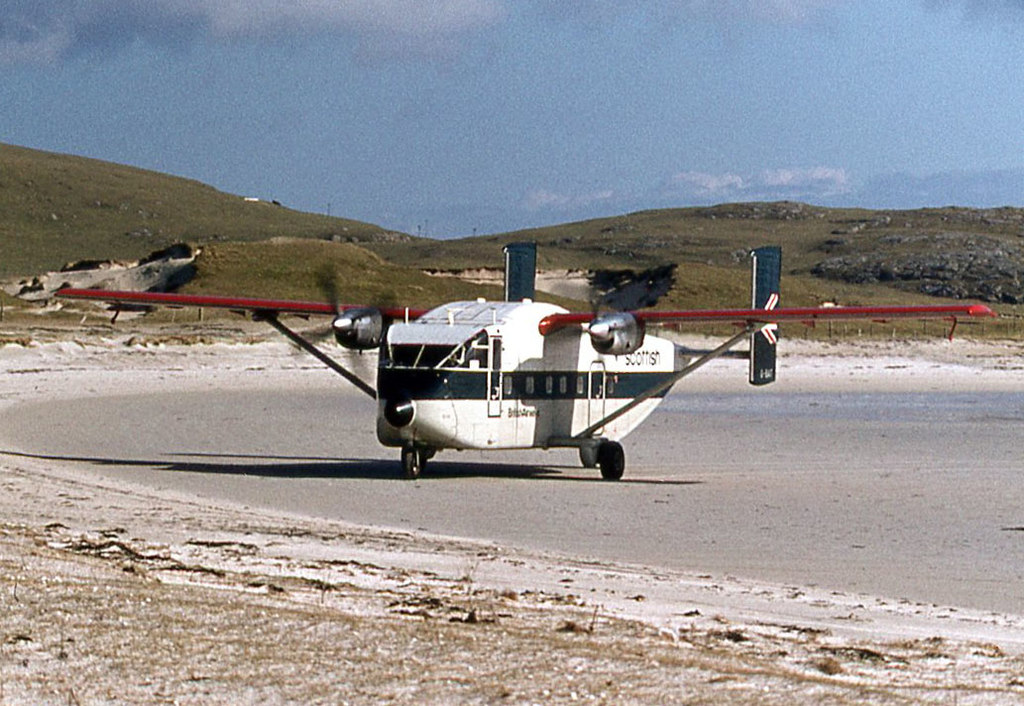
A British Airways (Scottish Division) Short Skyvan on the beach (Barra Airport) ca 1974

- Ayit Aviation and Tourism
- Summit Air
- Swala Aviation

== Former (airline) operators ==
- BEA / British Airways (Scottish Division) - operated three 1971-74
- Busy Bee / Air Executive Norway A/S - operated three 1974-84
- Gulf Aviation / Gulf Air - operated a total of six 1971-1983
- Loganair - operated one 1969-74
- Olympic Airways - operated two 1970-93
- Papuan Airlines (PNG) - operated two 1968-73
- Wien Consolidated (Alaska) - operated four 1967-74
- Oman Aviation/Oman Air - operated three 1981-1993

== Current and military operators ==
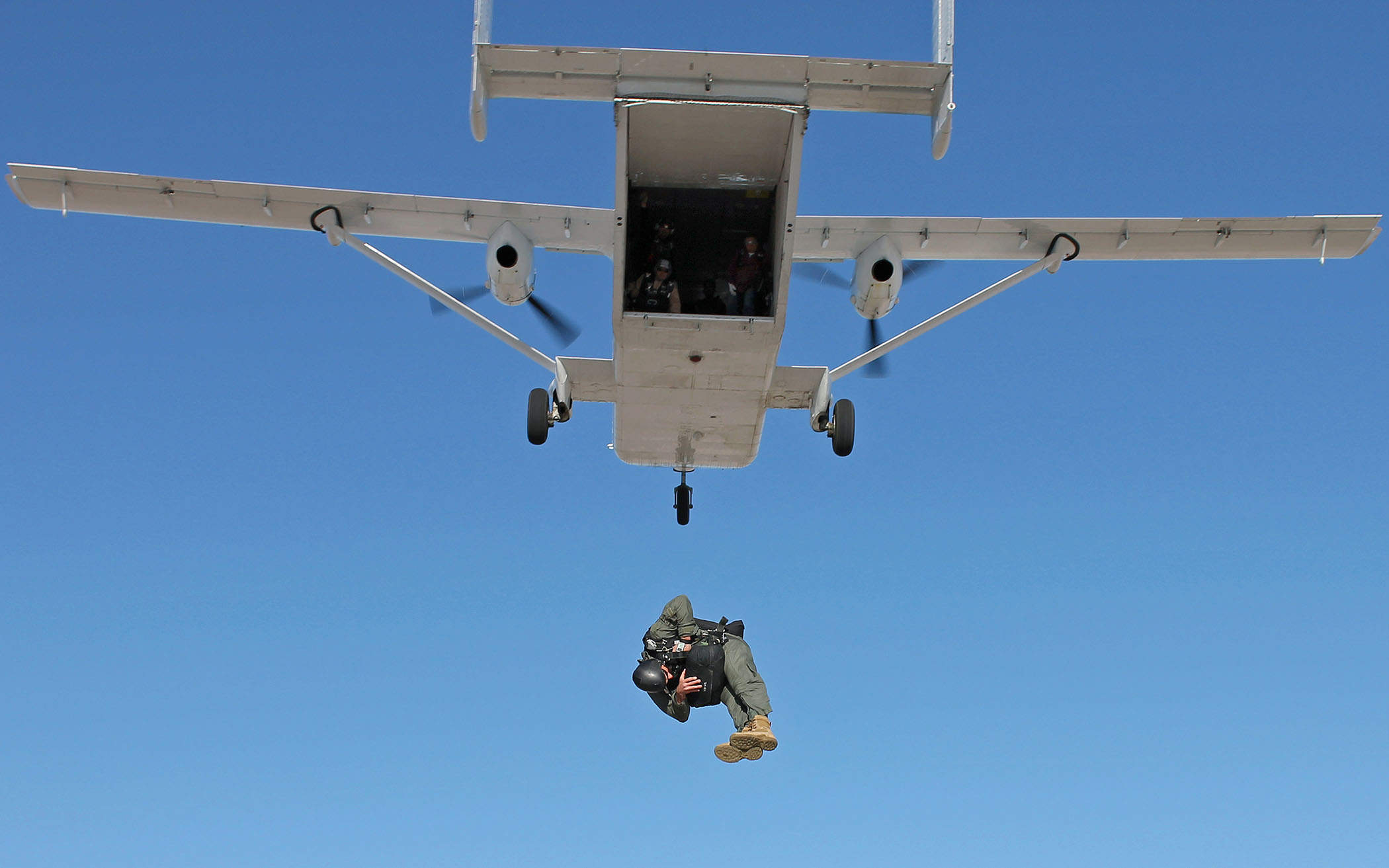
The Short Skyvan is popular as a skydiving launch platform

Skyvans still active in 2022–2024 include

- Collier Mosquito Control District (FL): N642M, N643M, N644M
- Perris Skydive (CA): SH.1859, 1885, 1907, 1911,
- Pink Aviation (Austria): SH.1881, 1932, 1964
- Skydive Deland (FL): SH.1842
- Skyforce (Poland): SP-HOP (SH.1906), (sister ship SP-HIP SH.1962 written off 3 September 2022), Ayit Aviation (Israel) 4X-AGP / SH.1893,
- Win Aviation (USA): Up to nine Skyvans

=== Military operators ===
Guyana

- Guyana Defence Force - Five acquired 1979-81, believed non-operational (2019). Two additional second-hand examples acquired in June 2019.

Oman

- Royal Air Force of Oman: Oman continues to operate five of its original 16 Skyvans as of December 2013.

=== Former military operators ===
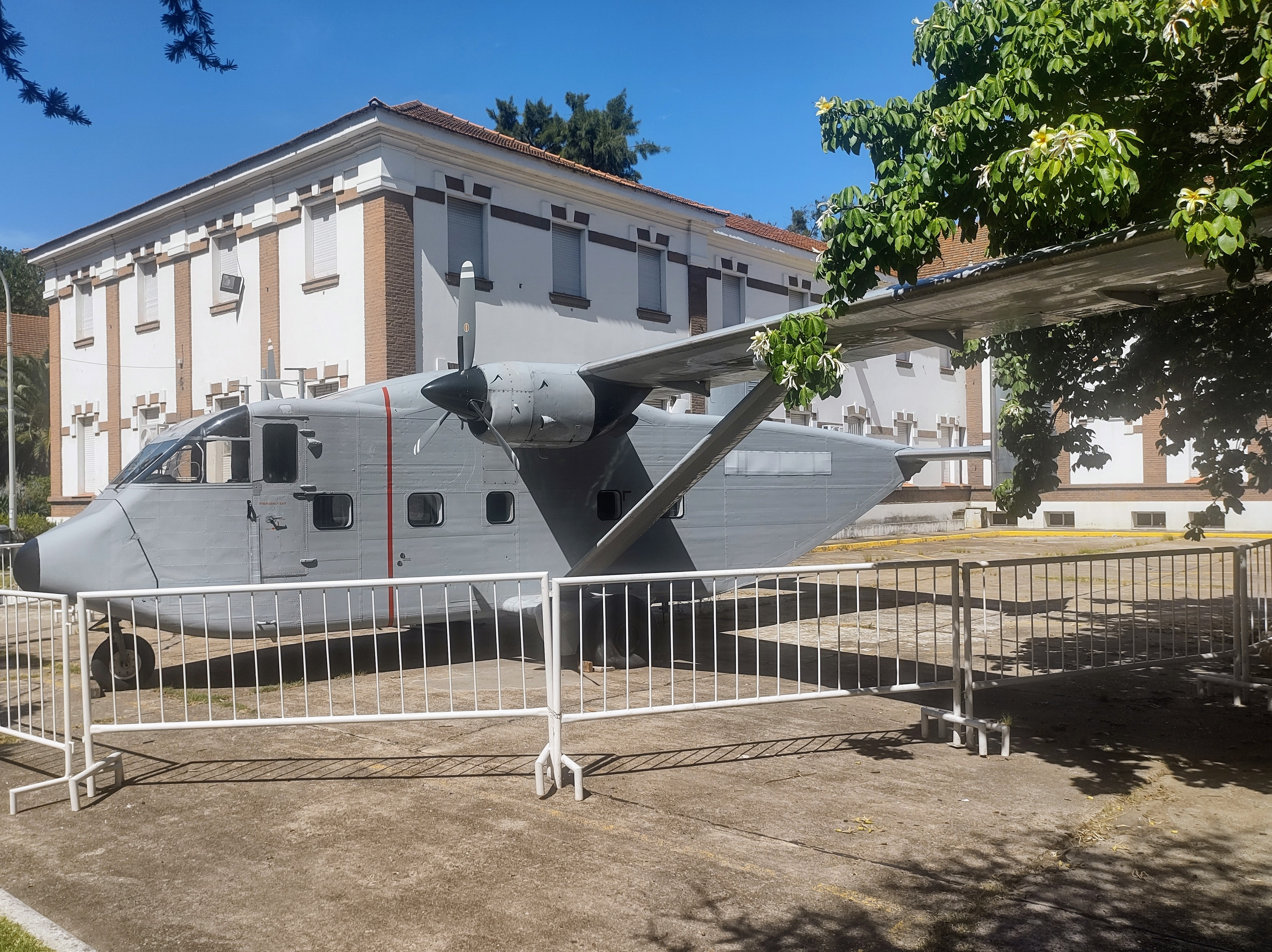
Argentine Naval Prefecture Skyvan 'PA-51' on display at the Museo Sitio de Memoria ESMA in Buenos Aires, Argentina. This particular aircraft was used to carry out death flights during the Dirty War.

Argentina

- Argentine Coast Guard: Bought five in 1971; two written off during Falklands War, remaining three sold in 1995 following replacement by five CASA C-212 Aviocars. In 2023 one of these Skyvans returned to Argentina and is on display at ESMA, Buenos Aires as a memorial to those killed in the notorious Death Flights.

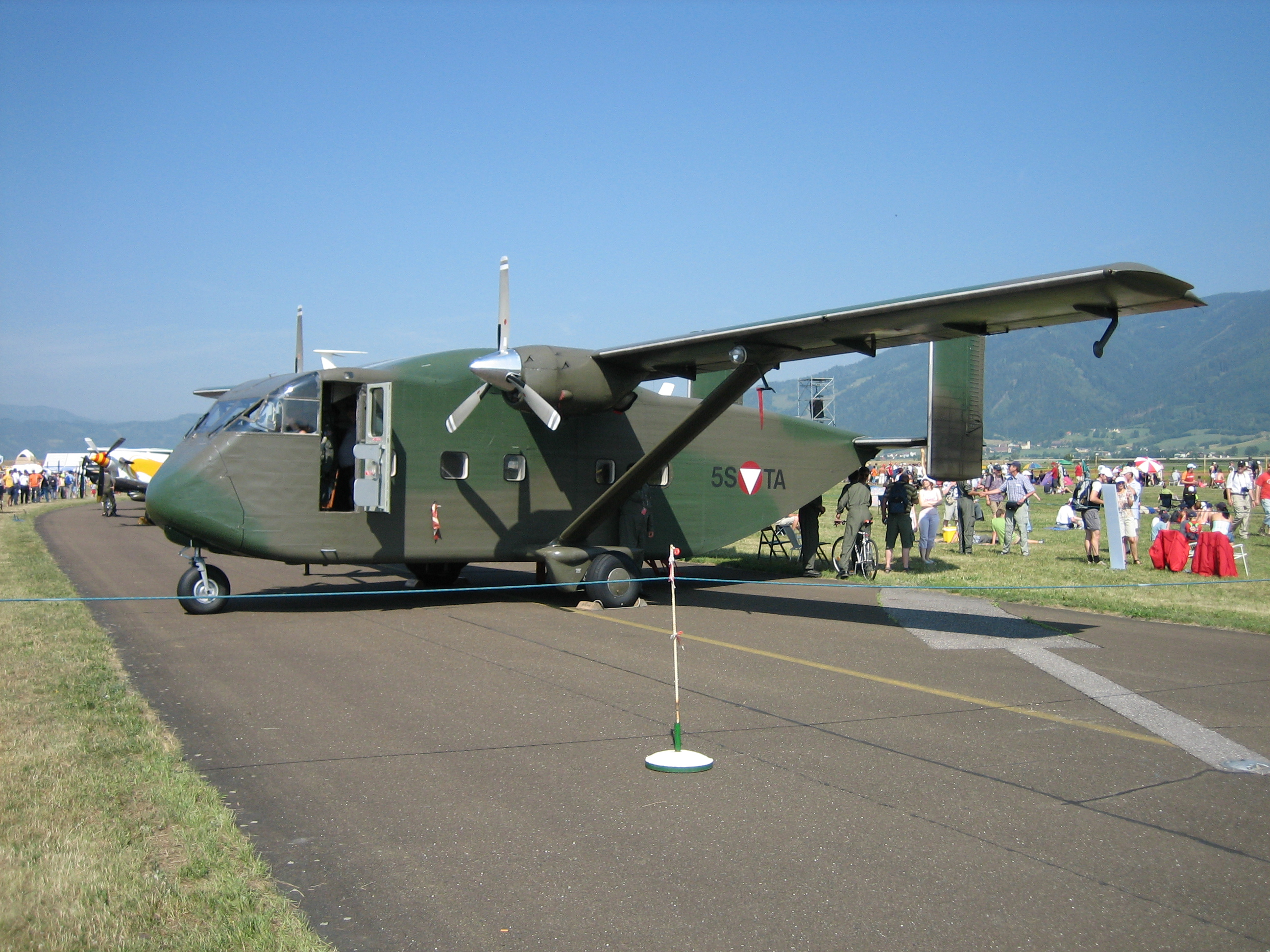
5S-TA, Austrian Air Force Skyvan 3M-400 in 2005 (now at Zeltweg Museum)

Austria

- Austrian Air Force 5S-TA & 5S-TB. 'TA now preserved at Militärluftfahrtmuseum, Zeltweg AB

Botswana

- Botswana Defence Force Air Wing

Ciskei

- Ciskei Defence Force

Ecuador

- Ecuadorian Army

Gambia

- Military of Gambia

Ghana

- Ghana Air Force

Indonesia

- Indonesian Air Force

Japan

- Japan Coast Guard

Lesotho

- Lesotho Defence Force – Air Squadron

Malawi

- Malawi Police Force Air Wing

Mauritania

- Mauritania Islamic Air Force: bought two Skyvan 3Ms in 1975

Mexico

- Mexican Air Force

Nepal

- Nepalese Army
  - Nepalese Army Air Service

Panama

- Panamanian Public Forces

Singapore

- Republic of Singapore Air Force
  - 121 Squadron, Republic of Singapore Air Force operated the Skyvan 3M for Utility transport and Search-and-locate duties from 1973 to 1993.

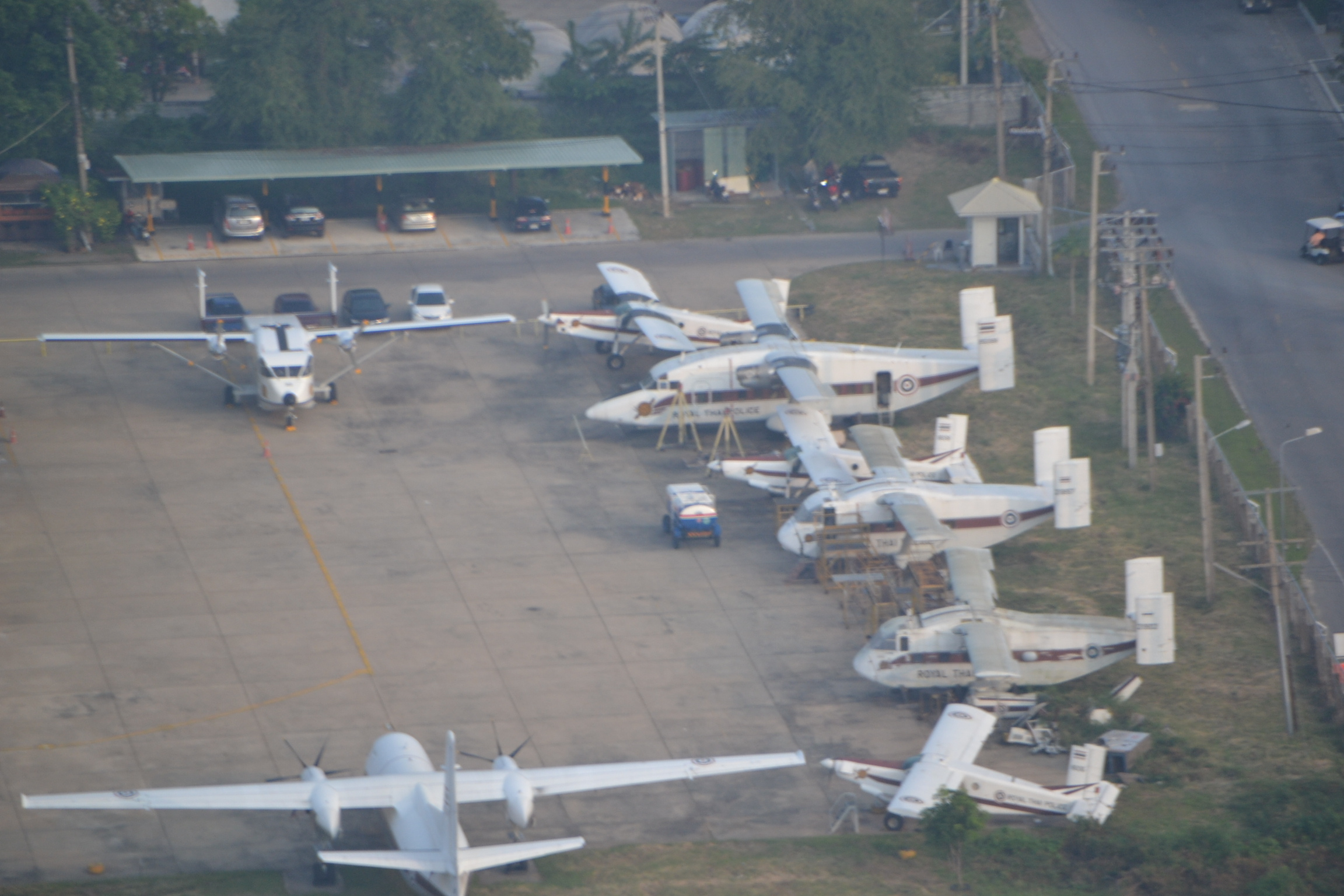
Royal Thai Police compound at Bangkok Don Mueang-DMK, October 2014. In view are three Shorts SC.7 Skyvans, a Shorts SD3-30, plus three PC 6 Turbo Porters, and a Fokker F-50

Thailand

- Royal Thai Police
  - Thai Border Patrol Police

United Arab Emirates

- United Arab Emirates Air Force (Note: The UAE is a federation of 7 Sheikdoms, each of which maintain a small army known as the Amiri Guard. One of which, the Emirate of Sharjah, purchased two Skyvan 3M's in the 1970's, and then sold them to the UAE air force in 1995.)
- Sharjah Amiri Guard

Yemen

- The Yemen Arab Republic (North Yemen) Air Force operated two Skyvans as of 1984. These aircraft were subsequently absorbed into the Yemen Air Force in 1990 as a result of Yemeni unification.

== Accidents and incidents ==
- On 1 September 1972, a Short Skyvan crashed on northeastern slope of Mt Giluwe due to poor visibility. Four people died as result of the crash.
- On 22 November 1976, a Gulf Air Short SC.7 Skyvan cargo plane travelling from Bahrain to Abu Dhabi-Al Bateen Airport experienced an engine failure. The crew abandoned the aircraft off Das Island. The two occupants were rescued while the airplane sank.
- On 25 August 1977, an Air Cargo Hawaii twin-turboprop Short SC.7 Skyvan crashed and burned while attempting to land at Keahole Airport. The pilot and passenger were killed. The crash occurred about 1.5 mi (2.4 km) short of the runway.
- On 18 December 1980, two Malaysia Air Charter Shorts SC.7 Skyvan (9M-AQG and 9M-AXN) collided in a unknown circumstance in Bayan Lepas International Airport, both aircraft suffered a small damaged and continued to service beyond repair.
- On 3 October 1986, an East Indonesia Air Taxi Shorts SC.7 Skyvan (registered PK-ESC) struck a mountain. All 10 passengers and 3 crew members were killed.
- On 31 January 1993, a Short SC.7 Skyvan operated by Pan Malaysian Air Transport (9M-PID) carrying 16 passengers and crew members including the airline executive manager went missing above northern Sumatra while en route to Banda Aceh. The wreckage was found approximately 17 years later by the Indonesian police. No survivors were found.
- On 30 July 1993, Shorts SC7 Skyvan 3-100 aircraft, carrying 17 passengers and two crew members, made an emergency landing at a football field at Long Loyang village when approaching the Marudi airport due to severe weather. One passenger died in the incident.

== Specification (Skyvan 3) ==
Data from Jane's Civil and Military Upgrades 1994-95

General characteristics

- Crew: 1–2
- Capacity: 19 passengers
- Length: 12.21 m (40 ft 1 in)
- Wingspan: 19.79 m (64 ft 11 in)
- Height: 4.60 m (15 ft 1 in)
- Wing area: 35.12 m^{2} (378.0 sq ft)
- Empty weight: 3,331 kg (7,344 lb)
- Max takeoff weight: 5,670 kg (12,500 lb)
- Fuel capacity: 1,109 L (244 imp gal; 293 US gal)
- Powerplant: 2 × Garrett AiResearch TPE-331-2-201A turboprops, 533 kW (715 shp) each
- Propellers: 3-bladed Hartzell HC-B3TN-5/T10282H variable-pitch propeller

Performance

- Maximum speed: 324 km/h (201 mph, 175 kn) max cruise at 3,050 m (10,010 ft)
- Cruise speed: 278 km/h (173 mph, 150 kn) econ cruise at 3,050 m (10,010 ft)
- Stall speed: 111 km/h (69 mph, 60 kn) flaps down, EAS
- Never exceed speed: 402 km/h (250 mph, 217 kn) EAS
- Range: 1,115 km (693 mi, 602 nmi)
- Service ceiling: 6,858 m (22,500 ft)
- Rate of climb: 8.3 m/s (1,640 ft/min)
- Takeoff run to 15 m (50 ft): 482 m (1,581 ft) (STOL)
- Landing run from 15 m (50 ft): 567 m (1,860 ft) (STOL)

== See also ==
Related development

- Short 330
- Short 360

Aircraft of comparable role, configuration, and era

- Antonov An-28
- CASA C-212 Aviocar
- De Havilland Canada DHC-6 Twin Otter
- Dornier 228
- GAF Nomad
- Harbin Y-12
- IAI Arava
- LET L-410
- PZL M28

Related lists

- List of civil aircraft
- List of STOL aircraft
