= I.S.T. XL-15 Tagak =

Philippine utility aircraft

XL-15 Tagak

General information
- Type: Utility or ambulance aircraft
- National origin: Philippines
- Manufacturer: Institute of Science and Technology
- Designer: Antonio J. de Leon
- Primary user: Philippine Air Force
- Number built: 1

History
- First flight: October 1954

The I.S.T. XL-15 Tagak (Swan in English) was a single-engine, twin-boom, high-wing monoplane designed after the I.S.T. XL-14 Maya and built in the Philippines in the mid-1950s. The result of a collaboration between a Government research institute and the Philippine Air Force, it was designed as a utility, liaison or ambulance aircraft and as a test bed for the use of local materials in aviation.

== Design and development ==
In the early 1950s, Philippines Institute of Science and Technology (I.S.T., previously known as the Bureau of Science) designed at least three different aircraft prototypes, both to investigate the scope for local aircraft design and production and to examine the use of indigenous materials in their construction. One such material of interest was Wobex (Woven bamboo experimental), a reinforced woven bamboo.

The XL-15 Tagak was the second of these prototypes, developed in collaboration with the Philippine Air Force. It was a single-engine, high-wing monoplane with a twin-boom layout and tricycle undercarriage to enable easy access to the fuselage pod via rear doors. The inner wing sections, fitted with slotted flaps on the trailing edges had constant chord but further out the wings tapered, with slotted ailerons. There was a single lift strut on each side between wing and lower fuselage, with an airfoil profile to add to the lift from the wings.

The fuselage of the Tagak was a wood and plywood framed semi-monocoque skinned with Wobex and ply. Its cabin, behind the 185 hp Lycoming flat six engine, was 3.26 m (10 ft 6 in) long to the rear of the pod. There were two front seats under the wing leading edge, two more behind and room for one or two (stacked) stretcher cases. The cabin had two windows on each side and the rear part of the pod, which projected behind the wing trailing edge, was also extensively glazed. The two tail booms, of all ply construction, were integral with the wing centre section. The fins, with long chord underside fillets, were integral with the booms. The tailplane was rectangular and extended beyond the fins, carrying a horn balanced elevator. The fixed surfaces were of wood and ply construction, with Wobex covering; control surfaces were fabric covered.

Flight testing of the Tagak began in October 1954. By 1956 some small modifications had been made: rudder area was increased and a shimmy-damper added to the nosewheel leg. Only one was built.

== Specifications ==
Data from Jane's All the World's Aircraft 1956/7

General characteristics

- Capacity: 4
- Length: 9.15 m (30 ft 0 in)
- Wingspan: 12.0 m (39 ft 4 in)
- Height: 2.80 m (9 ft 2 in)
- Wing area: 20.30 m^{2} (218.5 sq ft)
- Airfoil: NACA 23012 (inner section), USA 35B outer section
- Empty weight: 780 kg (1,720 lb)
- Gross weight: 1,250 kg (2,756 lb)
- Fuel capacity: 174 L (38 Imp gal, 46 US gal)
- Powerplant: 1 × Lycoming O-425A 6-cylinder horizontally opposed, air-cooled, 138 kW (185 hp)
- Propellers: 2-bladed fixed pitch

Performance

- Maximum speed: 200 km/h (120 mph, 110 kn)
- Cruise speed: 158 km/h (98 mph, 85 kn)
- Range: 675 km (419 mi, 364 nmi)
- Service ceiling: 4,000 m (13,000 ft)
- Rate of climb: 3.0 m/s (590 ft/min)

== See also ==
- I.S.T. XL-14 Maya

Aircraft of comparable role, configuration, and era

- Aero Ae 50
- Auster B.4
- Boeing L-15 Scout
- Miles M.68
- Praga XE-55
