= Praga E-55 =

1949 Czechoslovak prototype aircraft

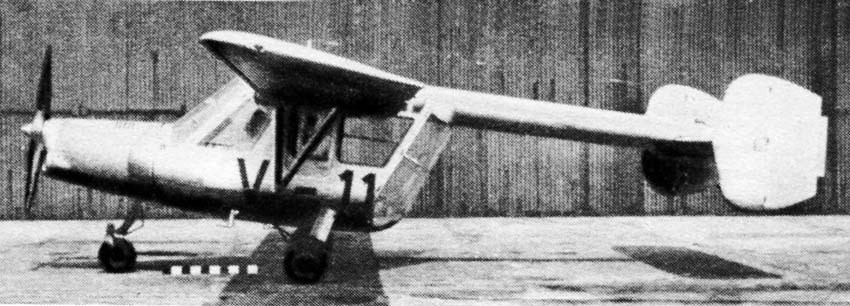

General information
- Type: Military observation/liaison aircraft
- National origin: Czechoslovakia
- Manufacturer: ČKD-Praga
- Number built: 1

History
- First flight: 1949

The Praga E-55 was a prototype Czechoslovak multi-purpose single-engine light aircraft designed by ČKD-Praga and intended for the Czechoslovak Army. A single example was built, first flying in 1949, but the type was not selected for production, and the single example was used by an aeroclub before being withdrawn from use in 1953.

== Design and development ==
In November 1947, the Czechoslovak Ministry of Defence issued requirements for two light aircraft for service in support of the Czechoslovak Army, a smaller two-seat aircraft, to be powered by the 78 kW (105 hp) Walter Minor 4-III engine and a larger three-seat aircraft to be powered by the 120 kW (160 hp) Walter Minor 6-III engine. The larger aircraft was required to fulfil a number of roles, including observation and liaison duties, casualty evacuation and glider towing. It was required to give a good view in all directions for the observation role, and to operate out of short airstrips and to be easy to maintain in the field. It also needed to be transportable by towing behind a motor car or on the back of a 2.5 tonne truck.

In the summer of 1948, the proposal from ČKD-Praga, the E-55, produced by chief designer Jaroslav Šlechta, was selected to meet the larger, Walter Minor 6, powered requirement, while Aero's Ae 50 was chosen for the smaller Walter Minor-4 powered requirement.

The E-55 was a high-winged tractor configuration monoplane, with a pod and boom arrangement. It had a short, heavily glazed fuselage nacelle, with the twin tail carried on the end of a tubular tailboom. The pilot and an observer sat side-by-side at the front of the enclosed cabin, with a seat for a third crewmember behind them. The right front seat could be removed to accommodate racks that could carry two stretchers one above the other, while a medical attendant could sit to the left of the stretchers, although this required operating at overload weights. For glider towing, the aircraft was operated as a single seater, with the radio removed to reduce weight. The fabric-covered metal wings were fitted with full-span leading-edge slots and flaps, which could be linked to the ailerons during landing. The aircraft had a fixed tricycle undercarriage.

The prototype was first flown in autumn 1949, and proved to be badly overweight and underpowered. It was unable to meet the demanding take-off and landing distance requirements of the specification, with take-off run exceeding the specified distance by 93% while the landing distance was 45% longer than required. Tests showed that the aircraft had a dangerous habit of losing height when flaps were retracted after take-off, while ground handling was also poor. In June 1950, the Czechoslovak government decided to abandon its observation aircraft programmes, with both the Praga E-55 and the Aero Ae 50 proving disappointing, with the Czechoslovak aircraft industry being directed to concentrate on license-production of Soviet combat aircraft. Limited development of the E-55 continued, with fitting a 160 kW (215 hp) M-8 engine proposed, but this engine never became available. Also in 1951, Praga proposed a crop-spraying version, the E-55-H, which would be fitted with a tank for 250 kg (550 lb) of chemicals, but this remained unbuilt.

In late 1952, the E-55 was transferred to Svazarm, the Czechoslovak paramilitary youth training organisation, where it was used for parachute training and glider towing. It was badly damaged in a landing accident at Mladá Boleslav on 29 June 1953, and was not repaired, and was scrapped, with its wing being used as a training aid at the Brno military academy, while its engine was used in the prototype Zlín Z-226.

== Operators ==
Czechoslovakia

- Svazarm

== Specifications ==
Data from Mongrafie: Praga E-55

General characteristics

- Crew: 3
- Length: 8.13 m (26 ft 8 in)
- Wingspan: 11.50 m (37 ft 9 in)
- Height: 2.28 m (7 ft 6 in)
- Wing area: 17.62 m^{2} (189.7 sq ft)
- Aspect ratio: 7.5:1
- Airfoil: NACA 23012
- Empty weight: 723 kg (1,594 lb)
- Gross weight: 1,040 kg (2,293 lb)
- Max takeoff weight: 1,207 kg (2,661 lb) (overload weight as ambulance)
- Powerplant: 1 × Walter Minor 6-III 6-cylinder air-cooled in-line piston engine, 118 kW (158 hp)
- Propellers: 2-bladed Aero LC 70, 1.95 m (6 ft 5 in) diameter wooden fixed-pitch propeller

Performance

- Maximum speed: 167 km/h (104 mph, 90 kn) (TAS)
- Cruise speed: 150 km/h (93 mph, 81 kn) (EAS)
- Stall speed: 70 km/h (43 mph, 38 kn) (TAS)
- Range: 450 km (280 mi, 240 nmi)
- Service ceiling: 3,250 m (10,660 ft)
- Time to altitude: 8 min 30 s to 1,000 m (3,300 ft)
- Take-off run to 15 m (50 ft): 410 m (1,350 ft)
- Landing run from 15 m (50 ft): 250 m (820 ft)

== See also ==
Aircraft of comparable role, configuration, and era

- Aero Ae 50
- Boeing L-15 Scout
