= Miles Aerovan =

1940s British civil utility aircraft

M.57 Aerovan
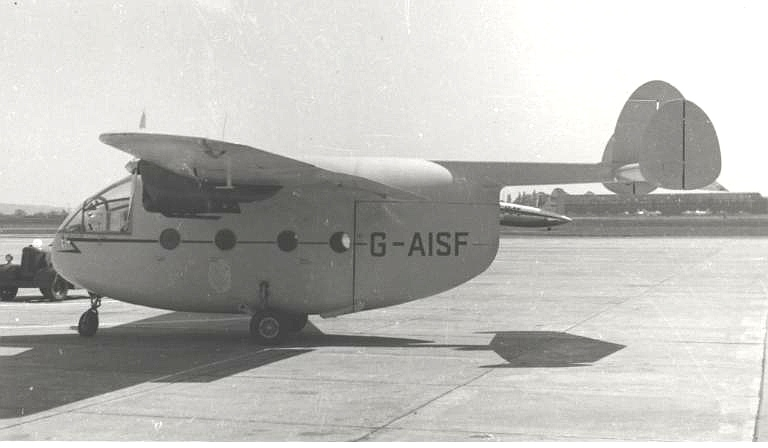
- Aerovan 4 of Channel Islands Air Freight at Manchester (Ringway) Airport in May 1955

General information
- Type: Short haul transport
- National origin: United Kingdom
- Manufacturer: Miles Aircraft
- Designer: George Herbert Miles
- Status: retired
- Number built: 48

History
- First flight: 26 January 1945
- Variants: Miles M.68; Hurel-Dubois Miles HDM.105

The Miles M.57 Aerovan was a British twin-engined short-range low-cost transport aircraft designed and produced by Miles Aircraft. It was primarily used for freight and passenger services.

Development of the Aerovan started during the latter years of the Second World War as an affordable freighter suitable for both civilian and military purposes. It was suited to austere operations, and possessed an atypically high payload capacity for its power output. Relatively large payloads, including a single car, could be transported by the aircraft, being loaded via its large clamshell freight door. While Miles intended to produce the Aerovan for the British Army as a wartime asset, development was put on hold by order of the Air Ministry until the end of the conflict.

On 26 January 1945, the maiden flight of the Aerovan took place. Quantity production formally commenced during 1946, although customer demand exceeded the company's production capacity. The Aerovan was primarily flown by commercial operators, but was also operated by a number of military users. Numerous variants were developed, and further models were envisioned, including a flying boat model; however, production was halted as a result of the company's bankruptcy in late 1947.

== Development ==
=== Background ===
Work on the Aerovan commenced during early 1944, being envisioned from the onset as a low-powered affordable freighter that was suited to both civilian and military purposes. Throughout the Second World War, George Miles had advocated for the use of such an aircraft within the British military in place of the then-standard practice of largely relying on gliders. Following the completion of the Miles Messenger's development, it was felt by Miles' design team that an aircraft of roughly double the power and weight would be a valuable pursuit; in particular, it was believed that such an aircraft would be a capable military transport for theatres such as the Burma campaign against Imperial Japan, as well as working in niche roles such as an air ambulance.

To suit its intended use, it was recognised early on that such an aircraft would need to be operated from austere airstrips and less hospitable terrain. Furthermore, it was recognised that the type could be subsequently scaled upwards into a larger freighter, of which Miles had formulated multiple proposals even prior to the conflict's end. Beyond its military applications, the coming post-war era would see civilian operators that would need large numbers of economic short range transports and small freighters. A high-wing configuration selected for the aircraft, being fitted with external aerofoil flaps and powered by a pair of Blackburn Cirrus Major piston engines. To facilitate easy loading, the entire rear of the fuselage was a door, necessitating the use of a relatively high tail boom.

The prototype was constructed at Miles' Woodley factory in Berkshire. On 26 January 1945, this prototype conducted the type's maiden flight, piloted by Tommy Rose. The performance of the prototype was immediately positive, proving to be both comfortable and relatively easy to fly. It proved to have an atypically high payload capacity for an aircraft of such power, being capable of lifting payloads in excess of its own weight when operated in a bare configuration. The results of the initial trials were submitted to the Air Ministry as the company prepared to put the Aerovan into immediate production to support the war effort. However, Miles' work was not met with approval, the company being censured for building the aircraft without authorisation and work on the project was suspended on the ministry's orders.

=== Into production ===
Work on the Aerovan was resumed shortly after Victory in Europe Day. While there was immediate demand for the type amongst civilian customers, Miles were not able to keep up with the rate of orders incoming, an outcome which aviation author Don Brown attributed to the Air Ministry's decision to place the project on hold. The production model of the Aerovan featured some changes from the prototype, including an 18-inch stretch of the fuselage and the use of porthole windows rather than rectangular ones. Quantity production of the Aerovan properly commenced during 1946; the majority of aircraft sold were to civilian operators, both domestic and overseas, although some military customers, including Israel and New Zealand, also emerged for the type.

Following negotiations, a licence was granted for the Aerovan to be manufactured in France, but no such aircraft were ever manufactured in the country. A single Royal New Zealand Air Force (RNZAF) aircraft was converted for aerial fertiliser spreading, while a second for aeromagnetic survey work, although it proved to be unsuccessful. A single Mark 4 was used for research with a Hurel-Dubois high aspect ratio wing in 1957, being then known as the Miles HDM.105. The prototype, which was retroactively designated the Mark 1, was later fitted with a 5/6th scale replica of the Armstrong Siddeley Mamba turboprop nacelle for the Miles Marathon; it was also subsequently outfitted with ailerons in line with the standard flaps.

Even prior to the Aerovan entering quantity production, Miles had ambitions to produce multiple derivatives of the type. One such design was a specialised aircraft for the air observation post role, intended to be operated by a four-man crew and featuring an enlarged glazed canopy to provide an all-round view in combination with a glazed rear fuselage section. Work was also undertaken on a flying boat derivative that would have had a single-step hull, keeping the rear freight door above the waterline with the assistance of two stabilising floats carried on outriggers set on either side of the hull. Both designs would have retained significant commonality with the standard Aerovan, sharing the wing, tail, and powerplant arrangement. Production of the Aerovan was abruptly terminated during late 1947 as a consequence of Miles' bankruptcy and subsequent dissolution.

== Design ==
The Miles Aerovan was a twin-engined high-wing monoplane of plastic-bonded plywood construction with some spruce and metal parts. It had a fixed tricycle undercarriage, three vertical tail and rudder units, one central and two as tailplane endplates, the configuration being generally reminiscent of the Miles Messenger. The wing featured electrically actuated flaps that could be adjusted to any angle, which were a recent innovation. On the ground, steering was achieved either by differential braking or differential operation of the throttles.

The Aerovan had a relatively deep-sided forward fuselage, which necessitated the use of a large fin area. A pair of pilots were accommodated within a large clear perspex canopy which formed the front dorsal part of the pod, while the pod-shaped fuselage was lined with four or five circular windows on either side for use by passengers. Access to the cabin and cockpit was via a door on the starboard side. For additional comfort, amenities such as soundproofing were typically installed. The Aerovan's lifting capabilities were such that payloads could weigh up to one tonne, along with sufficient volume to enable the carriage of a typical family car, which could be loaded through the clamshell doors set to the rear.

Various aspects of the Aerovan's configuration could be adjusted to meet customer demand; such alterations included the addition of skis for operations within snowy climates. The standard Aerovan was powered by a pair of Blackburn Cirrus Major piston engines; alternative powerplants included the de Havilland Gipsy Major and the Lycoming O-435, often necessitating the use of enlarged fins and rudders to cope with the increased power under all circumstances. By swapping the engines, the maximum speed could be increased by up to 20 mph and the rate of climb by up to 50 per cent.

== Operational history ==
The Aerovan was principally operated by civilian customers, with demand for the type from such operators outstripping Miles' production capacity. These aircraft were often used for a diverse range of operations; more obscure uses included the movement of livestock across the English Channel and as a flying removal van.

The majority of Mk 3 and 4 Aerovans were employed on passenger and freight services, charter work and joyriding in the UK and in the Near East. Meridian Air Maps operated Aerovan 4 G-AISF on aerial survey work from October 1955 until it crashed on takeoff from Manchester (Ringway) on 29 April 1957. The accident resulted in the deaths of two passengers and pilot Jean Lennox Bird, the first woman to receive RAF wings.

The RNZAF evaluated a pair of Aerovan 4s during 1950.

The newly formed Israeli Air Force acquired a single Aerovan G-AJWI from Britain, which entered service during June 1948. Able to use relatively short landing strips, it was repeatedly flown into settlements and Jerusalem airport in the face of defensive rifle fire. On 17 July 1948, the aircraft made a forced landing south of Tel Aviv and was destroyed by Palestinians.

== Variants ==
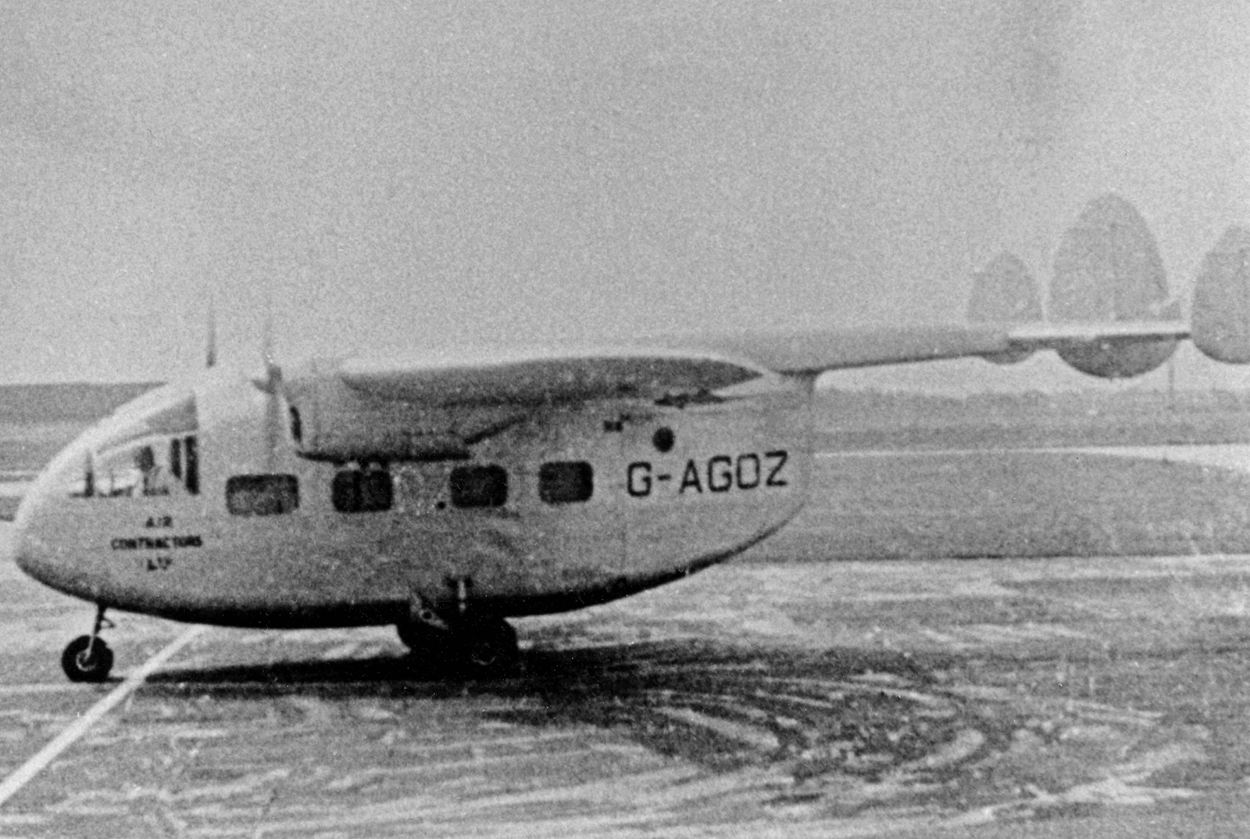
The prototype Aerovan 1 with four square windows on each side.

Aerovan 1
First prototype G-AGOZ. The short fuselage prototype had four square windows. Like the Aerovan 2, 3 and 4 it was powered by two 150 hp (112 kW) Blackburn Cirrus Major III piston engines.
Aerovan 2
Second prototype G-AGWO had a lower empty weight (by 410 lb) and an 18 in (0.46 m) longer fuselage with five round windows. The outer fin balance was modified.
Aerovan 3
Essentially identical to the Mk 2. Seven built, with six registered in the UK at one time or another, the other going to Belgium.
Aerovan 4
Mark 3 with detailed improvements; the main production variant distinguished by four circular windows. 43 built, including one originally built as a Mk 3. 40 of these were registered in the U.K. Two were later converted into the Mk 5 and HDM.105. Three further machines were built, one going to Iraq and two to the RNZAF (later sold on the civil market).
Aerovan 5
Powered by two 145 hp (108 kW) de Havilland Gipsy Major 10 piston engines. One built.
Aerovan 6
Powered by two 195 hp (145 kW) Avco Lycoming O-435-A piston engines. One built with enlarged outer fins taken from a scrapped Miles M.68.
Hurel-Dubois Miles HDM.105
Venture between Miles and Societe des Avions Hurel-Dubois through joint company H.D. et M. (Aviation), Ltd. Aerovan fitted with high-aspect ratio (20.5:1) wing of 75 ft 4 in (22.96 m) span of almost the same area as earlier marks, designed by Hurel-Dubois; influenced the design of the Shorts Skyvan. Former Mark 4 G-AJOF first flew as the HDM.105 on 31 March 1957 as G-35-3 (subsequently re-registered G-AHDM) with similar performance to earlier marks. Damaged and then dismantled in June 1958.
An 8,000 lb, 75 ft span HDM.106 with 290 hp Lycoming engines was proposed but not developed.

== Operators ==
=== Civil operators ===
Angola
Belgium

- Belgian Air Service

France

- Compagnie General de T.S.F

Iraq
Italy

- Societe Transporti Aerei Mediterranei

Kenya

- Airwork (East Africa)

Netherlands
New Zealand
Spain

- Aerotechnica
- Compañía Auxilar de Navegación Aérea

Switzerland
Turkey

- Turkish State Airlines
- Hurkus Hava Yollari

United Kingdom

- Air Contractors
- Airwork
- Arab Contracting and Trading Company
- Air Transport (Charter)
- British Nederland Airservices
- Channel Islands Air Freight
- Culliford Airlines
- East Anglian Flying Services
- Island Air Charters
- Kenning Aviation Ltd
- Lancashire Aircraft Corporation
- Lockwoods Flying Services
- Meridan Air Maps
- North Sea Air Transport
- North West Airlines
- Patrick-Duval Aviation
- Sivewright Airways
- Skyfreight
- Skytravel
- Ulster Aviation
- Universal Flying Services

=== Military operators ===
Israel

- Israeli Air Force

New Zealand

- Royal New Zealand Air Force
  - Research and Development Flight of No. 41 Squadron RNZAF

== Specifications (Aerovan Marks 2, 3, 4) ==
Data from British Civil Aircraft since 1919

General characteristics

- Crew: 2
- Capacity: 10 passengers
- Length: 36 ft (11 m)
- Wingspan: 50 ft (15 m)
- Height: 13 ft 6 in (4.11 m)
- Wing area: 390 sq ft (36 m^{2})
- Airfoil: root: NACA 23018; tip: NACA 2412
- Empty weight: 3,000 lb (1,361 kg)
- Gross weight: 5,800 lb (2,631 kg)
- Powerplant: 2 × Blackburn Cirrus Major IIA 4-cylinder air-cooled inverted in-line piston engine, 150 hp (110 kW) each
- Propellers: 2-bladed Fairey fixed-pitch propellers

Performance

- Maximum speed: 127 mph (204 km/h, 110 kn)
- Cruise speed: 112 mph (180 km/h, 97 kn)
- Landing speed: 40 mph (35 kn; 64 km/h)
- Range: 400 mi (640 km, 350 nmi)
- Service ceiling: 13,250 ft (4,040 m)
- Rate of climb: 620 ft/min (3.1 m/s)

== See also ==
Related development

- Miles M.68 "Boxcar"
- Miles M.71 Merchantman

Related lists

- List of aircraft of the Royal New Zealand Air Force and Royal New Zealand Navy
