= Aero Ae 50 =

Ae 50

General information
- Type: Artillery observation post
- National origin: Czechoslovakia
- Manufacturer: Aero Vodochody
- Number built: 1

History
- First flight: 14 April 1949

The Aero Ae 50 was a prototype propeller-driven military reconnaissance aircraft built in Czechoslovakia.

== Design and development ==
In November 1947, the Czechoslovak Ministry of Defence issued requirements for two light aircraft for service in support of the Czechoslovak Army, a smaller two seat aircraft, to be powered by the 105 hp (78 kW) Walter Minor 4-III engine and a larger aircraft to be powered by the 160 horsepower (120 kW) Walter Minor 6-III engine. The smaller aircraft was intended for artillery spotting, observation and liaison duties. The aircraft was required to provide a good view for the observer and to be able to operate out of small austere airstrips. It needed to have folding wings and be able to be towed behind, or carried on the back of a 2.5te truck. It was also required to be towed by other aircraft, to extend the aircraft's range.

At least eight projects were submitted to meet the requirement for a lighter aircraft, with Aero's design, the Ae 50, considered the best of the proposals. (Note: The Praga E-55 was built to meet the requirement for a larger aircraft powered by a Walter Minor 6-III.'"`UNIQ--ref-00000008-QINU`"') The Ae 50 was a high-wing monoplane of all metal construction, of pod and boom arrangement, with a fuselage that terminated abruptly immediately aft of the crew cabin, leaving the tailplane to be mounted on a single boom attached to the wing. It had a fixed, tail-wheel type undercarriage, with the tailwheel mounted at the rear of the fuselage. The wings were fitted with flaps and leading-edge slots.

Construction of a prototype began in mid-1948, and it was first flown on 14 April 1949. Initial testing identified a number of problems, including problems with the aircraft's undercarriage, poor directional control during take-off, and crucially, that the aircraft was significantly overweight. The aircraft underwent numerous changes to fix the aircraft's problems, including a larger rudder and modified wing slots and while these resolved many of the aircraft's problems, the aircraft remained overweight. It was handed over to the Czechoslovak Ministry of Defence for testing against the specification in October 1949, but on 13 June 1950, the Czechoslovak government decided to abandon development of observation aircraft, in order to concentrate the aircraft industry on license-production of Soviet combat aircraft. Flight testing continued slowly after this decision and was not completed until January 1953. After testing was complete, it was retained without being flown further for two years before being scrapped.

== Specifications (Ae 50) ==
Data from Mongrafie: Aero Ae-50

General characteristics

- Crew: 2
- Length: 7.10 m (23 ft 4 in)
- Wingspan: 10.48 m (34 ft 5 in)
- Height: 2.50 m (8 ft 2 in)
- Wing area: 15.10 m^{2} (162.5 sq ft)
- Empty weight: 473 kg (1,043 lb)
- Gross weight: 725 kg (1,598 lb)
- Fuel capacity: 75 L (20 US gal; 16 imp gal)
- Powerplant: 1 × Walter Minor 4-III inverted 4-cylinder air-cooled in-line piston engine, 78 kW (105 hp)

Performance

- Maximum speed: 176 km/h (109 mph, 95 kn) (EAS)
- Cruise speed: 150 km/h (93 mph, 81 kn)
- Stall speed: 62 km/h (39 mph, 33 kn)
- Range: 480 km (300 mi, 260 nmi)
- Service ceiling: 4,900 m (16,100 ft)
- Take off distance to 15 m (50 ft): 230 m (755 ft)
- Landing distance from 15 m (50 ft): 190 m (623 ft)

== See also ==
Aircraft of comparable role, configuration, and era

- Auster B.4
- Boeing L-15 Scout
- I.S.T. XL-15 Tagak
- Miles M.68
- Praga E-55
