= I.S.T. XL-14 Maya =

XL-14 Maya

General information
- Type: Experimental aircraft
- National origin: Philippines
- Manufacturer: Institute of Science and Technology
- Designer: Antonio J. de Leon
- Number built: 1

History
- First flight: early 1950s

The I.S.T. XL-14 Maya was a single-engine, light experimental aircraft designed and built in the Philippines in the early 1950s to investigate the use of indigenous materials in aircraft construction. Its construction uses a type of woven bamboo.

== Design and development ==
In the early 1950s in the Republic of the Philippines, the Institute of Science and Technology (I.S.T., previously known as the Bureau of Science) designed at least three different prototypes, both to investigate the scope for local aircraft design and production and to examine the use of indigenous materials in their construction. One such material of interest was Wobex (Woven bamboo experimental), a reinforced woven bamboo.

The XL-14 Maya (until 1995 the maya was the national bird of the Philippines) was the first of this series of prototypes. It was a single-engine, high-wing monoplane of standard layout except for its twin tail. The wing had constant chord and was built around two parallel, solid spars and wooden ribs. The leading edges were covered and reinforced with Wobex and the rest of the wing was fabric covered. The centre section was integral with the cabin top and the outer wings were braced on each side with V struts from the wing spars to the lower fuselage. Ailerons and slotted flaps were fitted. It had a strut braced tailplane, set slightly above the fuselage top on a short pylon. The tailplane carried almost rectangular endplate fins and rudders. The tail structure was wooden with fabric covering.

The Maya had a semi-monocoque fuselage with wooden stringers and Wobex mat covering. The cabin stood above the rear fuselage line, enclosing side-by-side seats with a third, occasional seat, or luggage space, behind. In front a 75 kW (100 hp) Lycoming flat four engine, with cylinder-heads exposed, drove a two blade propeller. It had a conventional undercarriage, with each mainwheel mounted on V-struts and half axles hinged to the fuselage central underside via rubber shock absorbers. The fixed tailwheel was steerable.

The date of the Maya's first flight is not known, though the aircraft was complete by May 1955 and a later design, the XL-15 Tagak was being flight tested by October 1954. Only one Maya was built, for although it was described as being suitable for agricultural use and for utility and observation work, its function was always as a constructional material experimental aircraft.

== Specifications ==
Data from Jane's All the World's Aircraft 1956/7

General characteristics

- Capacity: 2/3 (3rd passenger under 50kg (110 lb))
- Length: 6.30 m (20 ft 8 in)
- Wingspan: 10.24 m (33 ft 7 in)
- Height: 2.40 m (7 ft 10 in) tail up
- Wing area: 16.0 m^{2} (172 sq ft)
- Empty weight: 510 kg (1,124 lb)
- Gross weight: 780 kg (1,720 lb)
- Fuel capacity: 68 L (15 Imp gal, 18 US gal)
- Powerplant: 1 × Lycoming O-235-2 4-cylinder horizontally opposed, air-cooled, 75 kW (100 hp)
- Propellers: 2-bladed wooden, fixed pitch

Performance

- Maximum speed: 184 km/h (114 mph, 99 kn)
- Cruise speed: 150 km/h (93 mph, 81 kn)
- Range: 480 km (300 mi, 260 nmi)
- Service ceiling: 3,820 m (12,530 ft)
- Rate of climb: 3.6 m/s (710 ft/min) initial

== See also ==
- I.S.T. XL-15 Tagak
