= Auster B.4 =

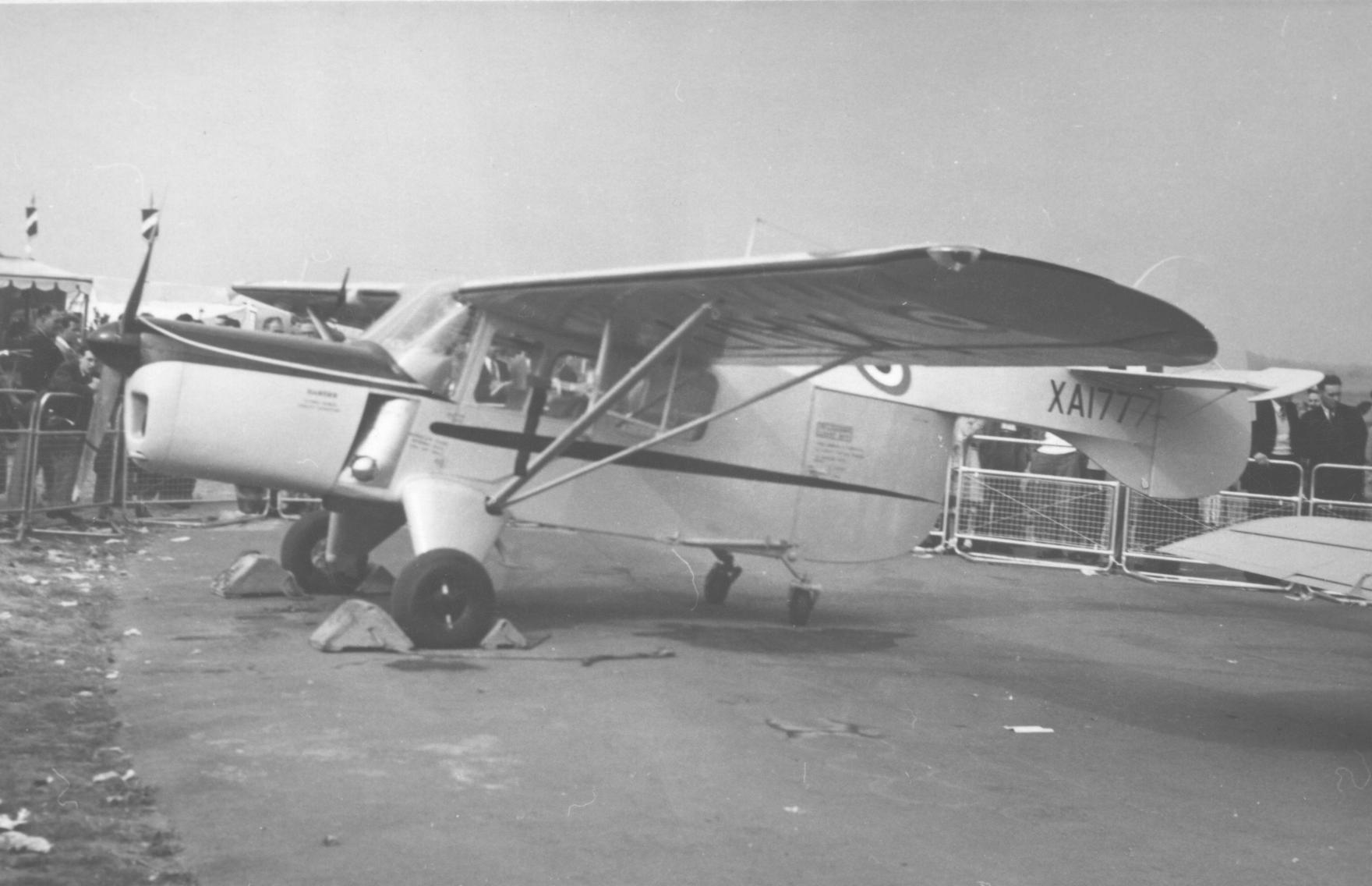
- The Auster B.4 at the Farnborough SBAC Show in September 1953

General information
- Type: Light freighter
- Manufacturer: Auster
- Number built: 1

History
- First flight: 7 September 1951

The Auster B.4 was an unusual British development of the Auster family of light aircraft in an attempt to create a light cargo aircraft.

== Design ==
The conventional fuselage was considerably redesigned, turning it into a pod-and-boom configuration carrying the tail unit on a high boom. The rear of the fuselage pod was equipped with clamshell doors for easy loading and unloading, and a quadricycle undercarriage was fitted, retaining the mainwheels from earlier Auster designs, but adding a tailwheel to each side of the fuselage pod. The fuselage floor had fittings for seats, cargo tie-downs, or litters for the air ambulance role.

== Operational history ==
The prototype was exhibited at the Farnborough Air Show in September 1953.

Although evaluated by the British Army in military markings, neither civil nor military orders ensued, and no examples were constructed beyond the single prototype

== Specifications ==
Data from Jane's All The World's Aircraft 1955–56

General characteristics

- Crew: 1 pilot
- Capacity:
  - 3 passengers or
  - 2 stretchers and attendant or
  - Cargo
- Length: 24 ft 8 in (7.52 m)
- Wingspan: 37 ft 0 in (11.28 m)
- Height: 8 ft 4 1/2 in (2.553 m)
- Wing area: 189.75 sq ft (17.628 m^{2})
- Empty weight: 1,642 lb (745 kg)
- Gross weight: 2,600 lb (1,179 kg)
- Fuel capacity: 23 imp gal (28 US gal; 100 L)
- Powerplant: 1 × Blackburn Cirrus Bombardier 702 4-cylinder inverted inline engine, 180 hp (130 kW)

Performance

- Cruise speed: 105 mph (169 km/h, 91 kn)
- Range: 300 mi (480 km, 260 nmi)
- Rate of climb: 730 ft/min (3.7 m/s)
- Takeoff distance to 50 ft (15 m): 1,245 ft (379 m)
- Landing distance from 50 ft (15 m): 765 ft (233 m)

== See also ==
Aircraft of comparable role, configuration, and era

- Aero Ae 50
- Boeing L-15 Scout
- I.S.T. XL-15 Tagak
- Miles M.68
