= Boeing L-15 Scout =

Piston engine liaison aircraft built by Boeing

L-15 Scout
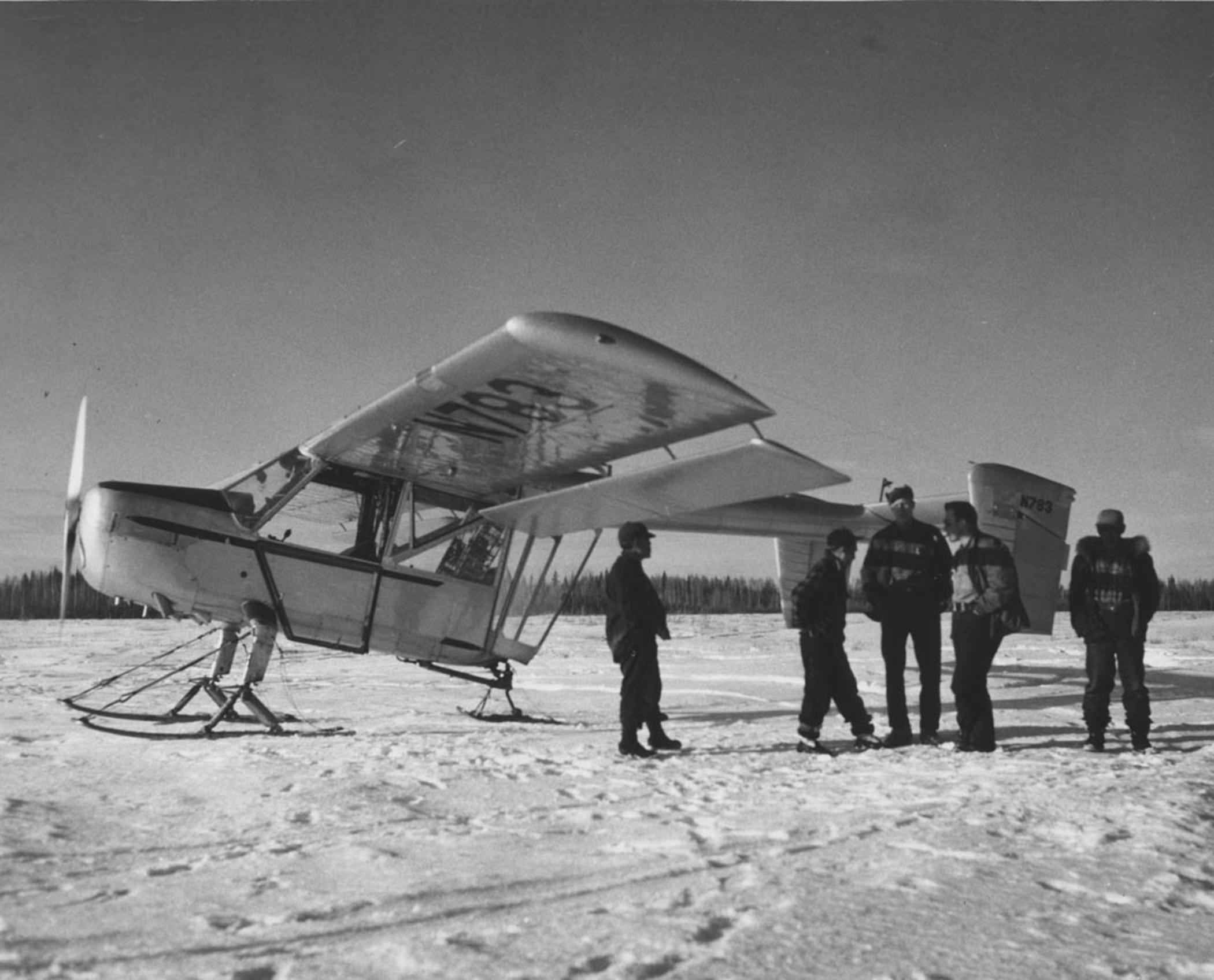
- US Fish & Wildlife Service YL-15

General information
- Type: Liaison
- National origin: United States
- Manufacturer: Boeing
- Status: Retired
- Primary users: US Army US Fish & Wildlife Service
- Number built: 12

History
- First flight: 13 July 1947

The Boeing L-15 Scout or YL-15 is a small, piston engine liaison aircraft built by Boeing in small numbers after World War II. It was a short take-off and landing (STOL) aircraft powered by a 125 hp (93 kW) Lycoming engine. The L-15 was intended to expand Boeing's product line as World War II drew to a close and Boeing's production of military aircraft declined. Boeing decided against marketing the L-15 as a general aviation aircraft, and the twelve produced went to the United States Army for testing, then were transferred to the United States Fish and Wildlife Service in Alaska for various duties.

== Design ==
The scout was a conventional geared aircraft that was also tested on ski and float gear. The unusual fuselage tapered sharply behind the pilot similar to a helicopter fuselage, with a high-mounted boom supporting the tail. The original design included a single vertical tail, but two small downward-mounted fins were used on all but the first aircraft. Spoilers were used to provide lateral control instead of ailerons, and full span trailing edge flaps were used. The rear fuselage was extensively glazed, and the tandem co-pilot could swivel their seat to the rear.

Although its maximum speed was only 112 mph (180 km/h), it was rated to be towed by another aircraft at speeds up to 160 mph (260 km/h).

== Surviving aircraft ==
- 47-432 – YL-15 airworthy with Keith N. Brunquist of Wasilla, Alaska.

== Operators ==
United States

- United States Army
- United States Fish and Wildlife Service

== Specifications (XL-15) ==
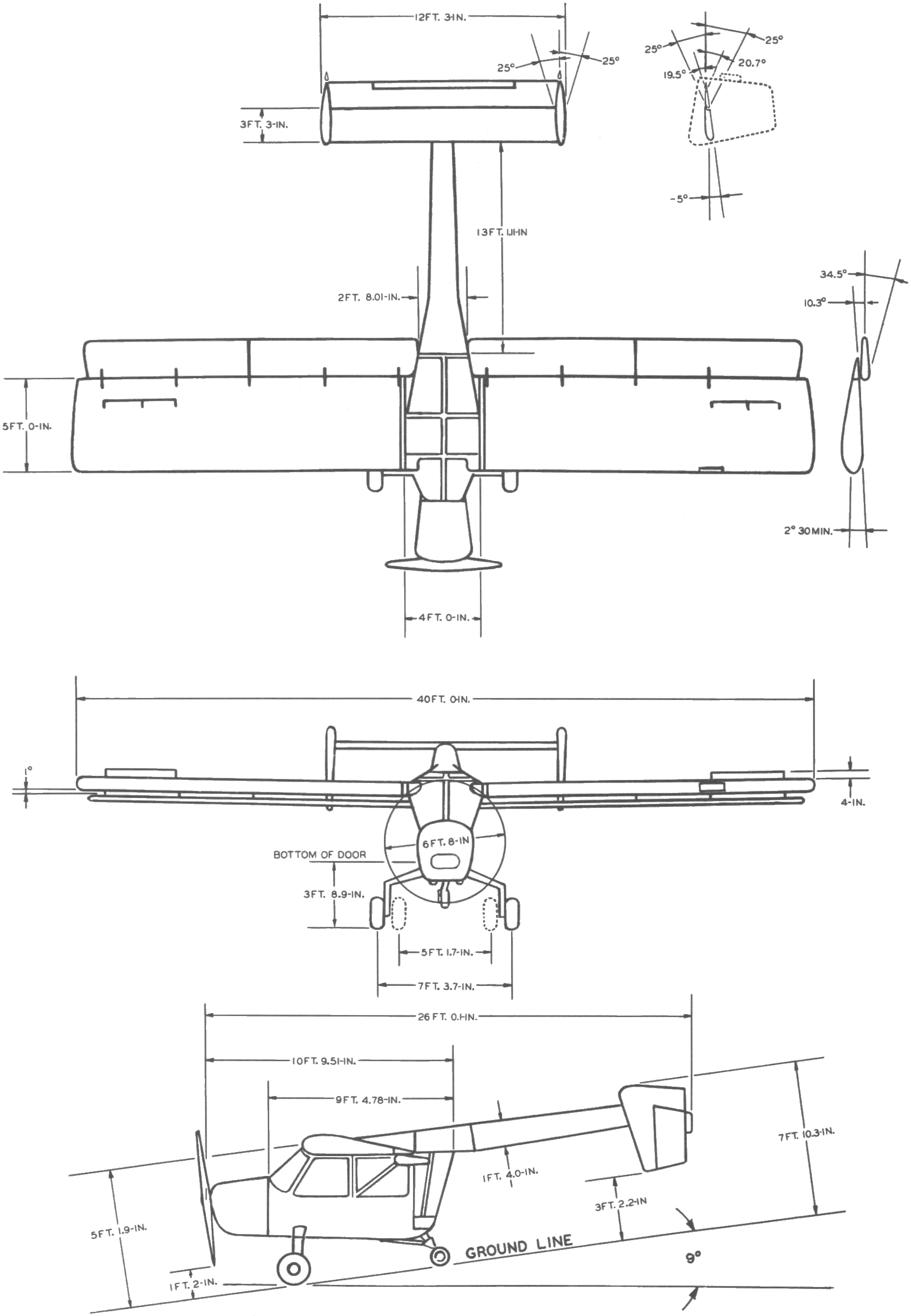
Boeing L-15 Scout 3-view drawing

Data from Boeing Aircraft since 1916

General characteristics

- Crew: Two (pilot and observer)
- Length: 25 ft 3 in (7.70 m)
- Wingspan: 40 ft 0 in (12.19 m)
- Height: 8 ft 8 1/2 in (2.654 m)
- Wing area: 269 sq ft (25.0 m^{2})
- Empty weight: 1,509 lb (684 kg)
- Gross weight: 2,050 lb (930 kg)
- Powerplant: 1 × Lycoming O-290-7 four-cylinder air-cooled horizontally-opposed engine, 125 hp (93 kW)

Performance

- Maximum speed: 112 mph (180 km/h, 97 kn)
- Cruise speed: 101 mph (163 km/h, 88 kn)
- Stall speed: 35 mph (56 km/h, 30 kn)
- Endurance: 2 1/4 hours normal, 5 1/2 hours with external fuel
- Service ceiling: 16,400 ft (5,000 m)
- Rate of climb: 628 ft/min (3.19 m/s)

== See also ==
Aircraft of comparable role, configuration, and era

- Aero Ae 50
- Auster B.4
- I.S.T. XL-15 Tagak
- Miles M.68
- Praga XE-55
