= Savoia-Marchetti SM.105 =

SM.105

General information
- Type: Military/Civil transport
- Manufacturer: Savoia-Marchetti

The Savoia-Marchetti SM.105 was a projected Italian four-engine military and civil transport aircraft of the post-World War II period.

== Design ==
The SM.105 was initially designed as an improved version of the SM.104, but following the release of concepts of the Fairchild XC-120 and Miles M.68, the SM.105 was redesigned with a detachable cargo section with a capacity of 64 m^{3} (2,260 ft^{3}). The cockpit was above the cargo bay. There were large doors both forward and aft. The useful load comprised eight horses and four assistants, or two cars. A civil version had 40 seats and a bar, with a fully glassed nose to "assure an uncommon view".

The most unusual feature of the aircraft was the detachable central fuselage, leaving the cockpit in the middle of the wing, similar to the CH-54 Tarhe helicopter of the 1960s. However conditions in 1947 were not favourable to this new project.

== Specifications (SM.105 estimated) ==
General characteristics

- Capacity: 64 m^{3} (2,260 cu ft) cargo bay
- Length: 24.8 m (81 ft 4 in)
- Wingspan: 36.3 m (119 ft 1 in)
- Height: 5 m (16 ft 5 in)
- Wing area: 120 m^{2} (1,300 sq ft)
- Empty weight: 13,000 kg (28,660 lb)
- Gross weight: 24,000 kg (52,911 lb)
- Powerplant: 4 × radial engines

Performance

- Maximum speed: 400 km/h (250 mph, 220 kn)
- Cruise speed: 380 km/h (240 mph, 210 kn)
- Service ceiling: 8,000 m (26,000 ft)
