= Swala Aviation =

Airlines of the Democratic Republic of the Congo

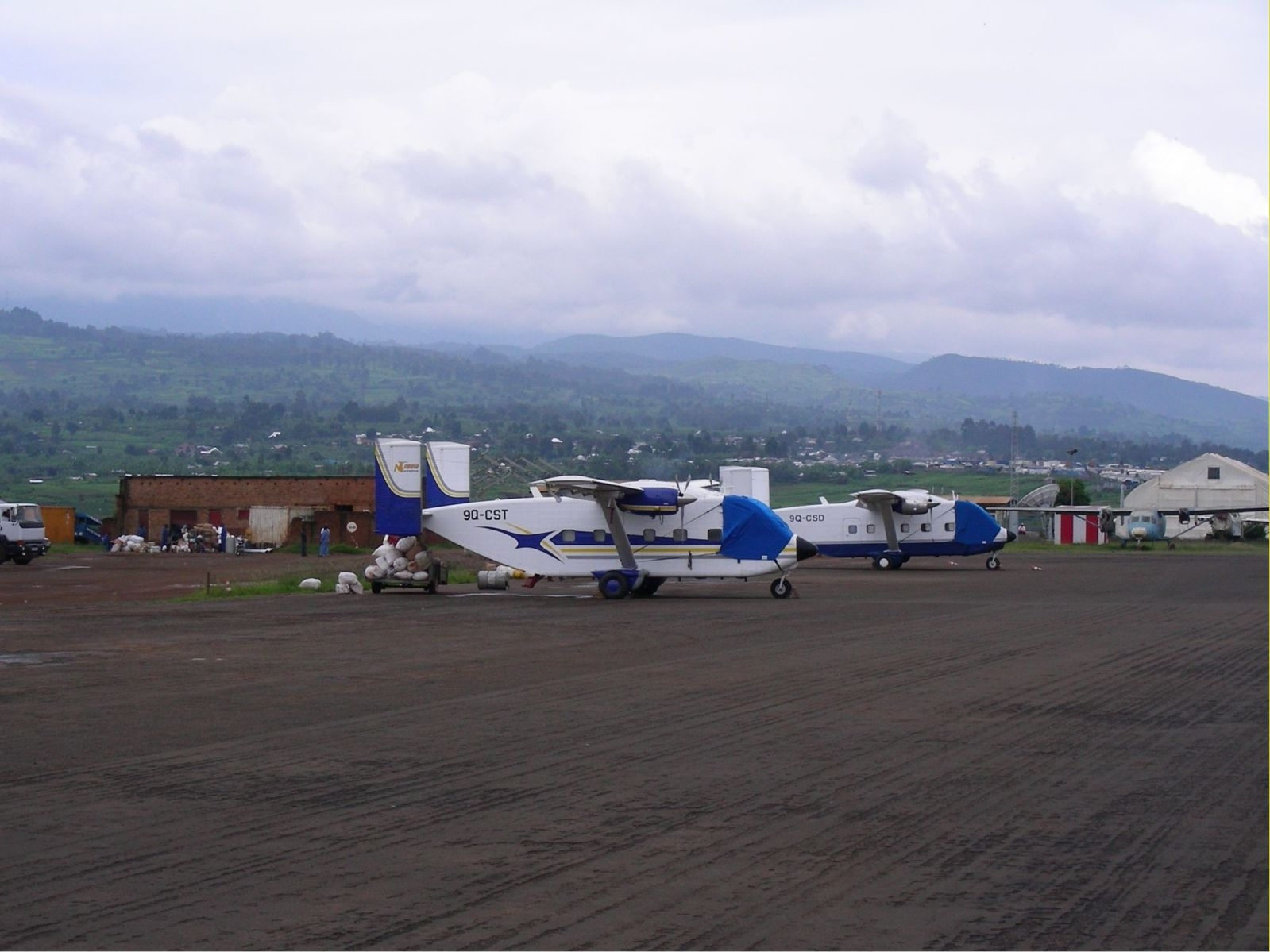
IATA	ICAO	Call sign
-	-	-
- Founded: 1984
- Hubs: Kavumu Airport
- Destinations: charters

Swala Aviation is a DRC-based charter airline based out of Kavumu Airport. It operates charter flights and like other DRC based carriers it is banned from the EU.

== History ==
- The airline was founded in 1984
- An Antonov AN 28 was written off in 2011 after an engine failure

== Fleet ==
As of July 2026, Swala Aviation operates the following aircraft:

Aircraft	In service	Orders	Passengers
Dornier 228	1	—	
Total	1	—	

Other aircraft have included:

- Short SC.7 Skyvan
- CASA 212

== Accident ==
Wreck of a Swala Aviation AN 28

In October of 2011, a Swala Aviation Antonov AN 28 took off from Shabunda Airport when the crew reported engine problems and tried to return to the airport and crashed near an embankment.
