= Hurel-Dubois Miles HDM.105 =

HDM.105

General information
- Type: Very high aspect ratio wing research
- National origin: France / United Kingdom
- Manufacturer: H.D. et M. (Aviation), Ltd. (Hurel-Dubois - wings / F.G. Miles Ltd. - fuselage and engines)
- Designer: Maurice Hurel
- Number built: 1

History
- First flight: 31 March 1957
- Developed from: Miles Aerovan

The Hurel-Dubois Miles HDM.105 was a transport aircraft fitted with very high aspect ratio wings for research purposes, building on research carried out with the Hurel-Dubois HD.10, and a stepping point to the planned production HDM.106 Caravan. The HDM.105/HDM.106 provided the starting point for the design of the Short SC.7 Skyvan.

== Design and development ==
Maurice Hurel, a French aircraft designer, became a champion of very high aspect ratio wings in a bid to significantly reduce induced drag, similar to the "Davis wing" of the Consolidated B-24 Liberator, but with much higher aspect ratios. After testing his wing design on the diminutive HD.10, Hurel was ready to progress to a full size transport aircraft, a joint venture between F.G. Miles Ltd. and Hurel-Dubois, fitting a Miles Aerovan with a very high aspect ratio wing and carrying out comparison tests.

The HDM.105 utilised the fuselage, tail unit and engines from Miles Aerovan Mk.4 G-AOJF, fitted with a Hurel designed 75 ft 4 in (23 m) span 20.5:1 aspect ratio wing of NACA laminar flow sections, supported on aerofoil section lifting struts. The wings were fitted with double-slotted flaps actuated by Miles electric actuators from the original Aerovan. Roll control was by differential ailerons and inter-connected upper-surface spoilers. With no room for fuel in the slender wings, 13 imp gal (16 US gal; 59 L) fuel tanks were fitted in the vertical undercarriage strut fairings.

== Operational history ==
The HDM.105, with B-class registration G-35-3 (subsequently re-registered G-AHDM), was first flown on 31 March 1957 by I.A. Forbes, but was later damaged beyond repair in a landing accident at Shoreham on 28 June 1958 and dismantled.

== Variants ==
=== HDM.106 Caravan ===
Following the successful testing of the HDM.105 the joint company H.D. et M (Aviation) Ltd, was established to exploit derivatives. The HDM.106 Caravan was to have been an all-metal 8,000 lb (3,629 kg)transport aircraft, with 75 ft (23 m) span wings, powered by 2x 290 hp (216 kW) Lycoming GO-480, 2x 340 hp (254 kW) Lycoming GSO-480B or 2x 320 hp (239 kW) Turbomeca Astazou I engines, but the HDM.106 did not progress beyond the drawing board with H.D. et M (Aviation) Ltd.

The design for the HDM.106 was sold to Shorts who developed it into the very successful Short SC.7 Skyvan, but with a much reduced, moderately high, aspect ratio of 11:1.

=== HDM.107 Aerojeep ===
The H.D.M.107, known as the Aerojeep, was a military version of the HDM.106 to a STOL light transport requirement of the US Army, to be powered by two 800 shp (597 kW) Lycoming T53 turboprop engines.

=== HDM.108 ===
An enlarged HDM.106 designed by Hurel-Dubois.

=== Miles M.111 ===
The Miles M.111 was proposed as a light single-engined transport utilising the outer wings and struts of the HDM.105, powered by a single 320 shp (239 kW) Turbomeca Astazou turboprop engine.

== Specifications (HDM.105) ==
Data from Flight : Foretaste of the Caravan - HDM.105 handling HDM.106 prospects, Jane's All the World's Aircraft 1958-59, Miles aircraft since 1925

General characteristics

- Crew: 2
- Capacity: up to 9 passengers or freight
- Length: 10.46 m (34 ft 4 in)
- Wingspan: 22.96 m (75 ft 4 in)
- Height: 4.24 m (13 ft 11 in)
- Wing area: 25.7 m^{2} (277 sq ft) wings only, 36 m^{2} (390 sq ft) including struts
- Aspect ratio: 20.5:1
- Airfoil: root: NACA 63_{4}-420; tip: NACA 63_{1}-412
- Empty weight: 1,460 kg (3,219 lb)
- Gross weight: 2,799 kg (6,170 lb)
- Fuel capacity: 120 L (26 imp gal; 32 US gal) in left and right vertical undercarriage strut fairings
- Powerplant: 2 × Blackburn Cirrus Major III 4-cylinder inverted air-cooled in-line piston engines, 116 kW (155 hp) each
- Propellers: 2-bladed Fairey fixed-pitch propellers

Performance

- Maximum speed: 204 km/h (127 mph, 110 kn) at sea level
- Cruise speed: 187 km/h (116 mph, 101 kn) at 3,000 ft (914 m)
- Service ceiling: 4,900 m (16,200 ft)
- Rate of climb: 3.34 m/s (657 ft/min)
- Rate of climb on one engine: 0.3 m/s (59 ft/min)
- Take-off run: 260 ft (79 m) minimum
- Take-off distance to 15 m (49 ft): 590 m (1,940 ft)
