= Fieseler Fi 333 =

German transport aircraft project

Fi 333
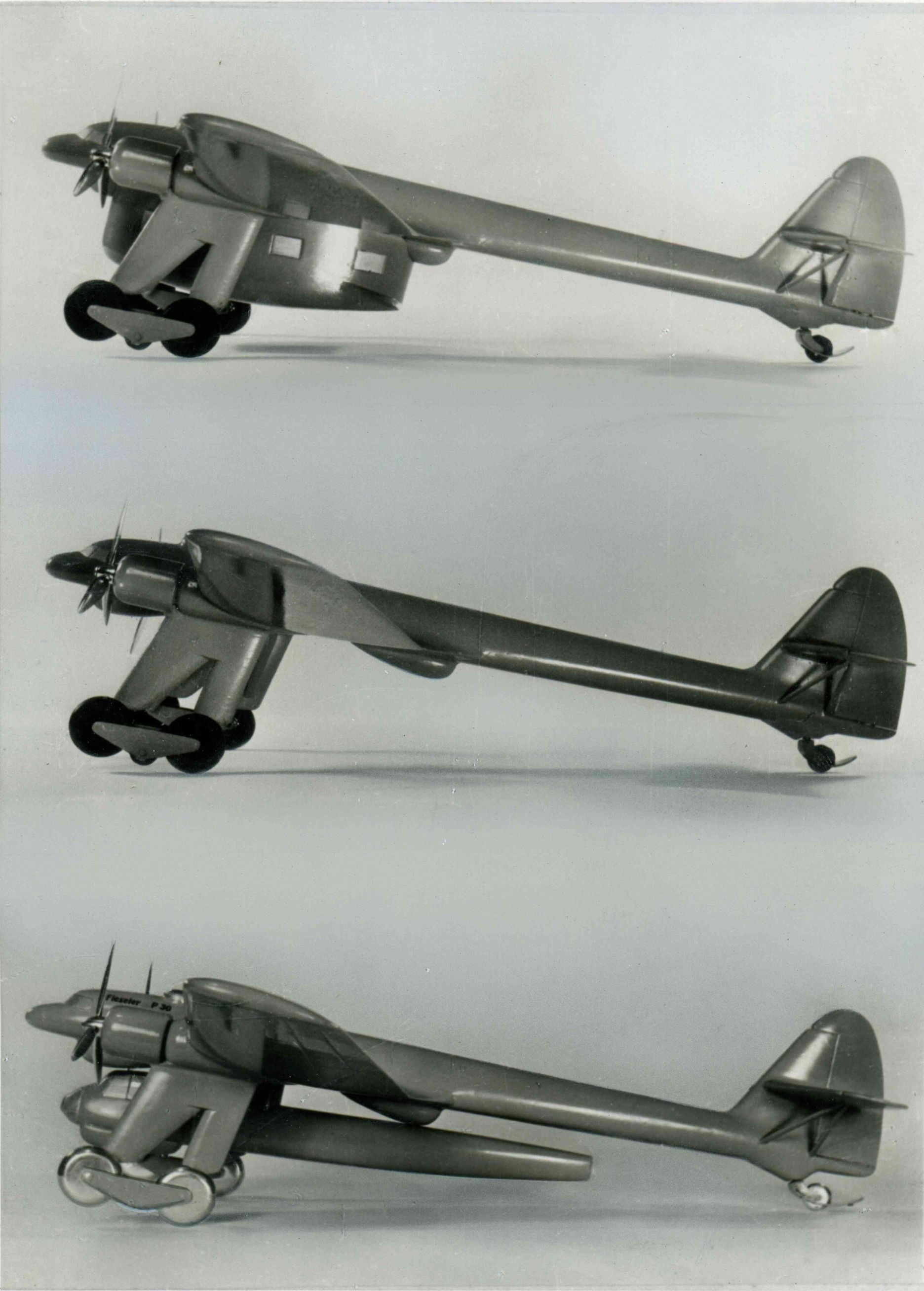
- A model of the Fieseler Fi 333 showing three possible configurations. Top: the aircraft carrying a cargo pod; Middle: the aircraft carrying no cargo; Bottom: the aircraft carrying the fuselage of another aircraft

General information
- Type: Transport
- National origin: Nazi Germany
- Manufacturer: Fieseler
- Status: Cancelled
- Primary user: Luftwaffe
- Number built: 3

The Fieseler Fi 333 was a prototype transport aircraft developed by Fieseler in 1942, and backed by the Luftwaffe.

== Design and development ==
The aircraft was to use detachable pods of varying sizes to carry cargo, a system that would allow a rapid turnaround on the ground. The tall, fixed undercarriage featured tandem independently sprung wheels. Power was provided by two 750 kW (1,000 hp) BMW Bramo 323D radial engines.

Three prototypes are believed to have been built.

== Specifications ==
Data from

General characteristics

- Crew: 2
- Length: 22.00 m (72 ft 2 in)
- Wingspan: 30 m (98 ft 5 in)
- Height: 5.8 m (19 ft)
- Empty weight: 6,101 kg (13,450 lb) with pod
- Gross weight: 9,201 kg (20,285 lb)
- Max takeoff weight: 11,502 kg (25,358 lb)
- Powerplant: 2 × BMW Bramo 323D nine-cylinder radial engine, 750 kW (1,000 hp) each

Performance

- Maximum speed: 299 km/h (186 mph, 162 kn)
- Stall speed: 64 km/h (40 mph, 35 kn)
- Range: 1,500 km (930 mi, 810 nmi)

== See also ==
Aircraft of comparable role, configuration, and era

- Fairchild XC-120 Packplane
- Kalinin K-7
