= Fairchild XC-120 Packplane =

Prototype airlifter model by Fairchild

XC-120 Packplane
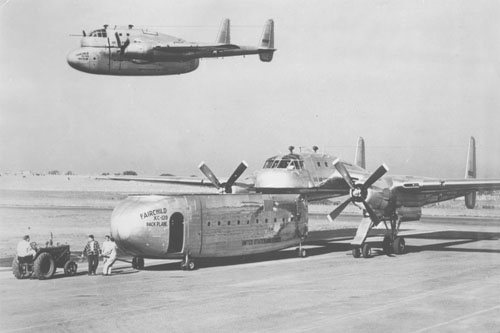
- Composite image of the sole XC-120 on the ground, and in flight.

General information
- Type: Military transport aircraft
- Manufacturer: Fairchild
- Number built: 1

History
- First flight: 11 August 1950
- Developed from: C-119 Flying Boxcar

The Fairchild XC-120 Packplane was an American experimental modular aircraft first flown in 1950. It was developed from the company's C-119 Flying Boxcar, and was unique in the unconventional use of removable cargo pods that were attached below the fuselage, instead of possessing an internal cargo compartment.

== Design and development ==
The XC-120 Packplane began as a C-119B fuselage (48-330, c/n 10312) with a point just below the flight deck cut off to create the space for the detachable cargo pod. The fuselage was raised by several feet, and smaller diameter "twinned" wheels were installed forward of each of the main landing gear struts to serve as nosewheels, while the main struts were extended backwards.

All four landing gear units, in matching "nose" and "main" sets, could be raised and lowered to allow cargo to be preloaded into the pods; it was claimed that such an arrangement would speed up loading and unloading cargo.

Production aircraft were to be designated C-128.

== Operational history ==
Only one XC-120 was built. Though the aircraft was tested extensively and made numerous airshow appearances in the early 1950s the project went no further. It was tested by the Air Proving Ground Command at Eglin Air Force Base, Florida, in 1951, before the project was abandoned in 1952. The prototype was eventually scrapped.

== Specifications (XC-120) ==
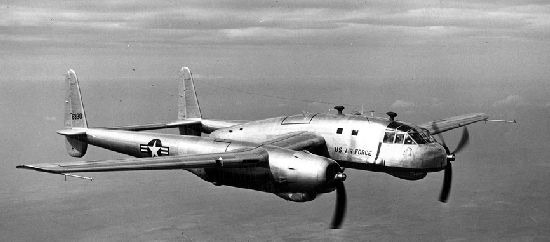
XC-120 without its cargo container

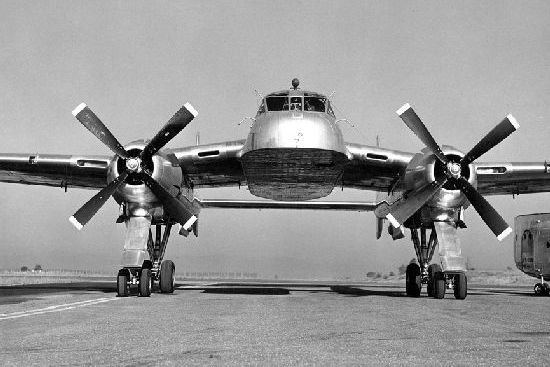
The XC-120 on the ground

Data from

General characteristics

- Crew: Five (pilot, copilot, flight engineer, two loadmasters)
- Capacity: 20,000 lb (9,090 kg) (2,700 cu.ft)
- Length: 82 ft 10 in (25.25 m)
- Wingspan: 106 ft 6 in (32.46 m)
- Height: 25 ft 1 in (7.65 m)
- Wing area: 1,447 sq ft (134.4 m^{2})
- Empty weight: 16,195 lb (7,386 kg) (without container)
- Gross weight: 51,646 lb (23,426 kg)
- Max takeoff weight: 64,000 lb (29,030 kg)
- Powerplant: 2 × Pratt & Whitney R-4360 Wasp Major radial engines, 3,250 hp (2,420 kW) each for takeoff

Performance

- Maximum speed: 220 kn (250 mph, 400 km/h)
- Cruise speed: 152 kn (175 mph, 282 km/h)
- Range: 1,990 nmi (2,290 mi, 3,690 km)
- Service ceiling: 23,900 ft (7,300 m)

== See also ==
Related development

- Fairchild C-82 Packet
- Fairchild C-119 Flying Boxcar

Aircraft of comparable role, configuration, and era

- Fieseler Fi 333
- Savoia-Marchetti SM.105
- Miles M.68

Related lists

- List of military aircraft of the United States
- List of military transport aircraft
