= Miles M.68 =

M.68
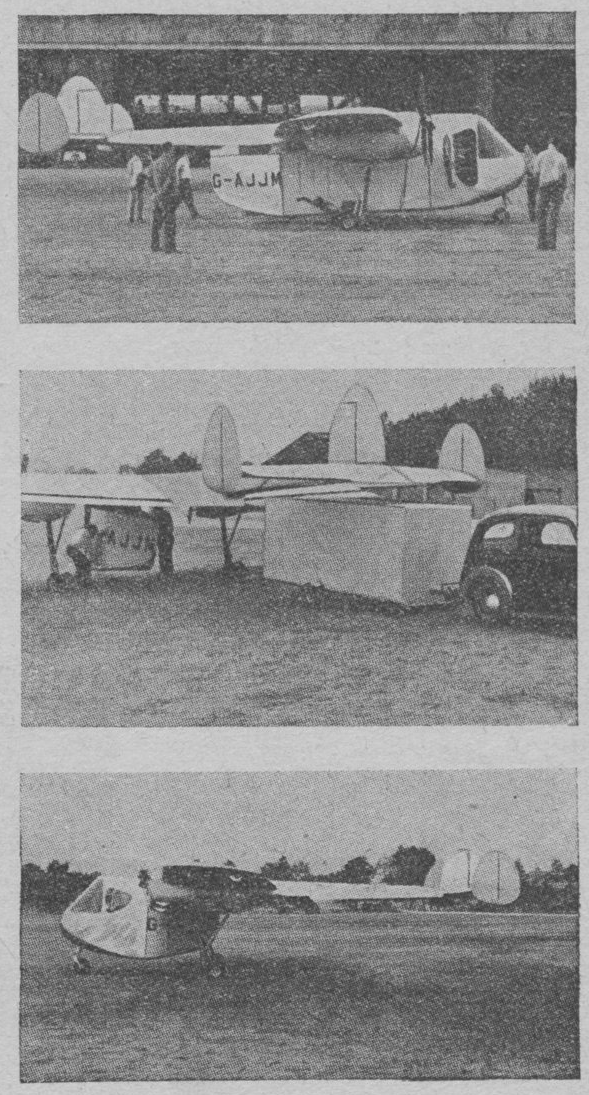
- M.68 detachable cargo container configuration

General information
- Type: Air freighter
- National origin: United Kingdom
- Manufacturer: Miles Aircraft Ltd
- Number built: 1

History
- First flight: 22 August 1947
- Retired: 1948
- Developed from: Miles Aerovan

The Miles M.68 was a 1947 attempt to produce a containerised freighter aircraft by the modification of the Miles Aerovan. The container or air-trailer was part of the fuselage but could be dismounted and towed on the road.

== Development ==
The Miles M.68, sometimes but unofficially known as the Boxcar, generated considerable excitement at its launch in 1947 because of its novel approach to air freight. The key idea was to pack freight into a wheeled container or "air-trailer" that could be towed on the road but which became part of the freight aircraft's fuselage for air transport. It was possible to do this by modifying the Miles Aerovan, which had a conveniently podded fuselage largely independent of the boom that then carried the tail. The M.68 was created by making the pod in two parts, the pilot's cockpit forward and a fairing behind, between which the container could be mounted.

The span and length of the M.68 were the same as those of the Aerovan. The beam aft of the pod was unchanged, bearing the same tail unit with three fins, one central and two as endplates. All three carried rudders though only the central one was horn balanced, as on the Aerovan 2. The taper on the horizontal tail was carried by the trailing edge, which had unbalanced elevators with trim tabs. The wings, like those of the Aerovan were of low aspect ratio, with flaps along all the trailing edge not occupied by ailerons. The M.68 differed in having four rather than two engines, though because it used the 90 hp (67 kW) Blackburn Cirrus Minor II rather than the 155 hp (116 kW) Blackburn Cirrus Major 3s of the Aerovan, the net gain in power was only 50 hp (37 kW) or 16%. With the container in place the fuselage pod of both aircraft was about the same length; when no container was carried the rear fairing of the M.68 could be brought forward to mate with the rear bulkhead of the cabin. The container itself was 10 ft (3.05 m) long and 4 ft 6 in 1.37 m) on each side; it could carry 1,600 lb (725 kg) of freight

The fixed main undercarriage of the Aerovan was attached to the lower fuselage. Since in the M.68 the equivalent section might not be present, a different layout was required and the M.68 used long fixed rearward sloping legs passing upwards through the inner engine cowlings. These each carried a pair of small landing wheels. The fixed nose wheel was also different, being a little shorter and castored; the overall undercarriage arrangement placed the bottom of the container close to the ground. There were also changes to the cabin, which was less rounded and had less generous glazing than the Aerovan.

Only one M.68, registered G-AJJM was built. It flew for the first time on 22 August 1947 and appeared at the SBAC show at Radlett in September that year. Before it flew there, the outer endplate fins had been significantly modified from the blunt bottomed form of the Aerovan to a much deeper, symmetrical and near elliptical form. It was scrapped the following year, though its deep elliptical fins were used on the Lycoming powered Aerovan 6. 1947 was the last year of trading for Miles Aircraft Ltd, whose assets were taken over by Handley Page.

== Specifications ==
Data from Jackson 1960, pp. 389

General characteristics

- Crew: 2
- Length: 36 ft 0 in (10.97 m)
- Wingspan: 50 ft 0 in (15.24 m)
- Powerplant: 4 × Blackburn Cirrus Minor II 4-cylinder inverted inline air-cooled, 90 hp (67 kW) each

Performance

- Maximum speed: 140 mph (225 km/h, 120 kn)
- Cruise speed: 130 mph (209 km/h, 110 kn)
- Range: 400 mi (644 km, 350 nmi) with full payload of 1,600 lb (725 kg)

== See also ==
- Fairchild XC-120 Packplane

Related development

- Miles Aerovan

Aircraft of comparable role, configuration, and era

- Aero Ae 50
- Auster B.4
- Boeing L-15 Scout
- I.S.T. XL-15 Tagak
