= List of Mikoyan and MiG aircraft =

This is a list of aircraft produced by Russian Aircraft Corporation MiG, formerly Mikoyan, a Russian aircraft manufacturer.

== Models ==
Designation	NATO	Year	Stage	Remarks
MiG-1		1940	Production	Fighter, prototypes called I-200
MiG-3		1940	Production	Fighter and interceptor, testbed for numerous experimental variants, most notably I-211/MiG-9E
Mig-5/DIS		1941	Prototype	Escort fighter; also known as the MiG-5
MiG-6		1940	Design	Reconnaissance/ground attack aircraft, remained a paper project
MiG-7		1944	Prototype	MiG-3 re-engined with an AM-38 inline engine
MiG-7				Reserved for an unbuilt production version of the I-222
MiG-8 "Utka"		1945	Prototype	Liaison aircraft
MiG-9	Fargo	1946	Production	Fighter, MiG's first jet, prototype called I-300, testbed for variants
MiG-15	Fagot	1947	Production	Fighter, world's most-produced jet, prototype called I-310
MiG-17	Fresco	1950	Production	Fighter, based on the MiG-15
MiG-19	Farmer	1952	Production	Fighter, MiG's first supersonic fighter, first mass-produced supersonic fighter, prototype called I-360
MiG-21	Fishbed	1959	Production	Fighter and interceptor, most-produced supersonic fighter, widely exported to other air forces, originally to be based on Ye-5 but instead developed from MiG-19 variant SM-12, basis of many other variants
MiG-23	Flogger	1967	Production	Fighter and fighter-bomber, most-produced variable-geometry aircraft, originally to be based on Ye-2A or Ye-8
MiG-25	Foxbat	1964	Production	Interceptor and reconnaissance-bomber, fastest mass-production aircraft
MiG-27	Flogger-D/J	1970	Production	Ground-attack aircraft derived from the MiG-23
MiG-29	Fulcrum	1977	Production	Air superiority fighter and multi-role fighter
MiG-29K	Fulcrum-D	1988	Production	Carrier-based multi-role fighter, naval variant of the MiG-33/MiG-29M
MiG-29M	Fulcrum-E	2005	Production	Improved variant of MiG-29 and MiG-33
MiG-31	Foxhound	1975	Production	Interceptor, based on the MiG-25
MiG-33		1980	Prototype	Eventually delivered as MiG-29, designation also used for development of some MiG-29 variants and marketed as "Super Fulcrum"
MiG-35	Fulcrum-F	2007	Production	Air superiority and multi-role fighter, based on the MiG-29M
MiG-41		Planned	Design	Stealth interceptor/heavy fighter under development as Mikoyan PAK DP, expected to be introduced in 2028

== Other experimental projects and prototypes ==
- LMFS - proposed stealth light multirole fighter; cancelled in favor of the Sukhoi Su-75
- MiG 18-50 - convertible regional airliner/business jet proposal, early 1990s; not built
- MiG I-3 family - fighter prototypes, 1956-1958
- MiG I-7 - heavy interceptor fighter prototype developed from the I-3, 1957
- MiG I-75 - swept-wing interceptor developed from the I-7, 1958; lost to the Sukhoi T-43
- MiG I-210 (IKh) - MiG-3 re-engined with a ASh-82A radial engine, 1941; also known as MiG-3-82 or MiG-9 (not to be confused with the later MiG-9 jet fighter)
- MiG I-211 (E) - high-altitude fighter prototype, refined I-210, 1943
- MiG I-220 (A) - high-altitude interceptor prototype, 1943
- MiG I-221 (2A) - I-220 with longer wingspan and an AM-39A turbo-supercharged engine, 1943
- MiG I-222 (3A) - I-221 with an AM-39B-1 turbo-supercharged engine and other changes, 1943; production version would have been designated MiG-7 (not to be confused with the MiG-3 variant of the same name)
- MiG I-224 (4A) - I-222 with an aluminum cockpit and special high-altitude propeller, 1944
- MiG I-225 (5A) - I-220 with AM-42B or AM-42FB engine, all-metal wings and cockpit, 1944; heaviest and most powerful of the I-220 family
- MiG I-230/MiG-3U (D) - improved MiG-3 powered by a AM-35A engine, 1942
- MiG I-231 (2D) - I-230 with AM-39 engine and all-metal fuselage, 1943
- MiG I-250 (N) - motorjet fighter prototype, 1945; also known as the MiG-13
- MiG I-260 (K) - initial MiG-9 design with wing-mounted engines, 1945; cancelled in favor of the I-300
- MiG I-270 (Zh) - rocket-powered interceptor prototype, 1947
- MiG I-300 (F) - prototype for MiG-9, 1946; MiG's first jet fighter design
- MiG I-301 (FS) - production version of MiG-9
- MiG I-301T (FT) - experimental two-seat trainer version of MiG-9, 1946; first Soviet aircraft with an ejection seat
- MiG I-302 (FP) - experimental version of MiG-9 with the N-37 cannon moved to the side of the fuselage
- MiG I-305 (FL) - experimental version of MiG-9 powered by a Lyulka TR-1A engine, 1947
- MiG I-307 (FF) - prototype version of MiG-9 powered by afterburning RD-20F engines, 1947
- MiG I-308 (FR) - prototype version of MiG-9 with RD-21 engines and a pressurized cockpit, 1947
- MiG I-310 (S) - prototype for MiG-15, 1947
- MiG I-312 (ST) - prototype for MiG-15UTI
- MiG I-320 (FN) - version of MiG-9 with a Rolls-Royce Nene engine, 1948
- MiG I-320 (R) - twin-engine, all-weather heavy fighter-interceptor prototype, 1949
- MiG I-330 (SI) - prototype for MiG-17, 1949
- MiG I-340/SM-1 - prototype version of MiG-17 with two Mikulin AM-5 engines, 1952; led to the MiG-19
- MiG I-350 (M) - fighter prototype, 1951; first Soviet fighter to maintain supersonic speed
- MiG I-360/SM-2 - derivative of I-350, powered by Mikulin AM-5 engines, 1952
- MiG I-370/I-1 - swept-wing supersonic fighter prototype, 1955
- MiG LFI project
- MiG MFI objekt 1.44/1.42 - 1986–2000
- MiG PBSh-1 - proposed attack aircraft, 1940; cancelled in favor of the Ilyushin Il-2; also known as the MiG-4
- MiG PBSh-2 - biplane derivative of PBSh-1, 1940; also known as the MiG-6
- MiG SVB - proposed regional airliner and tactical transport, 1990-94; not built
- MiG-105 Spiral - crewed test vehicle, 1965; cancelled in favor of the Buran project
- MiG-110 - proposed cargo/passenger aircraft, 1995; not built
- MiG-2000 - ramjet-powered SSTO spaceplane, 1990s; lost to the Tupolev Tu-2000
- MiG-AT - advanced trainer/light attack prototype, 1996; lost to the Yakovlev Yak-130
- Skat - stealth UCAV
- Ye-8 - supersonic jet fighter aircraft prototype, 1962; planned replacement of the MiG-21
- Ye-150 family - prototype interceptors, 1950s

== Gallery ==
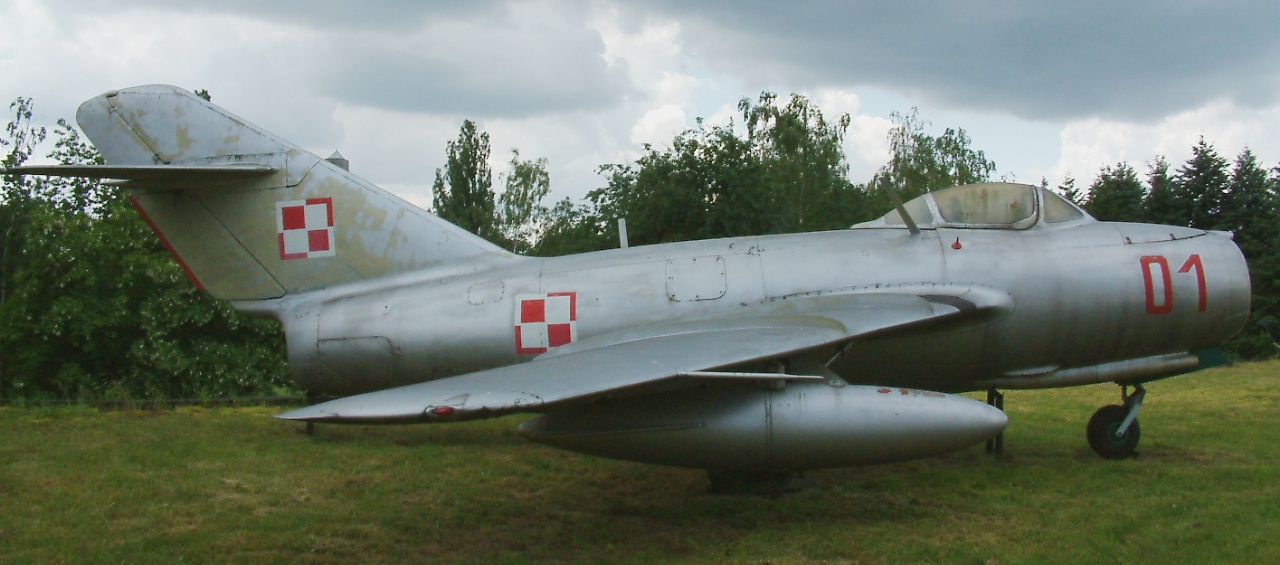
MiG-15

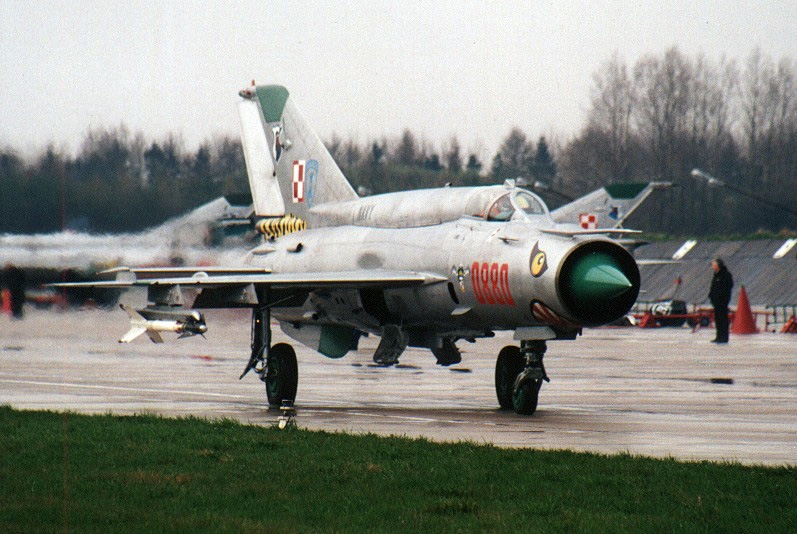
MiG-21

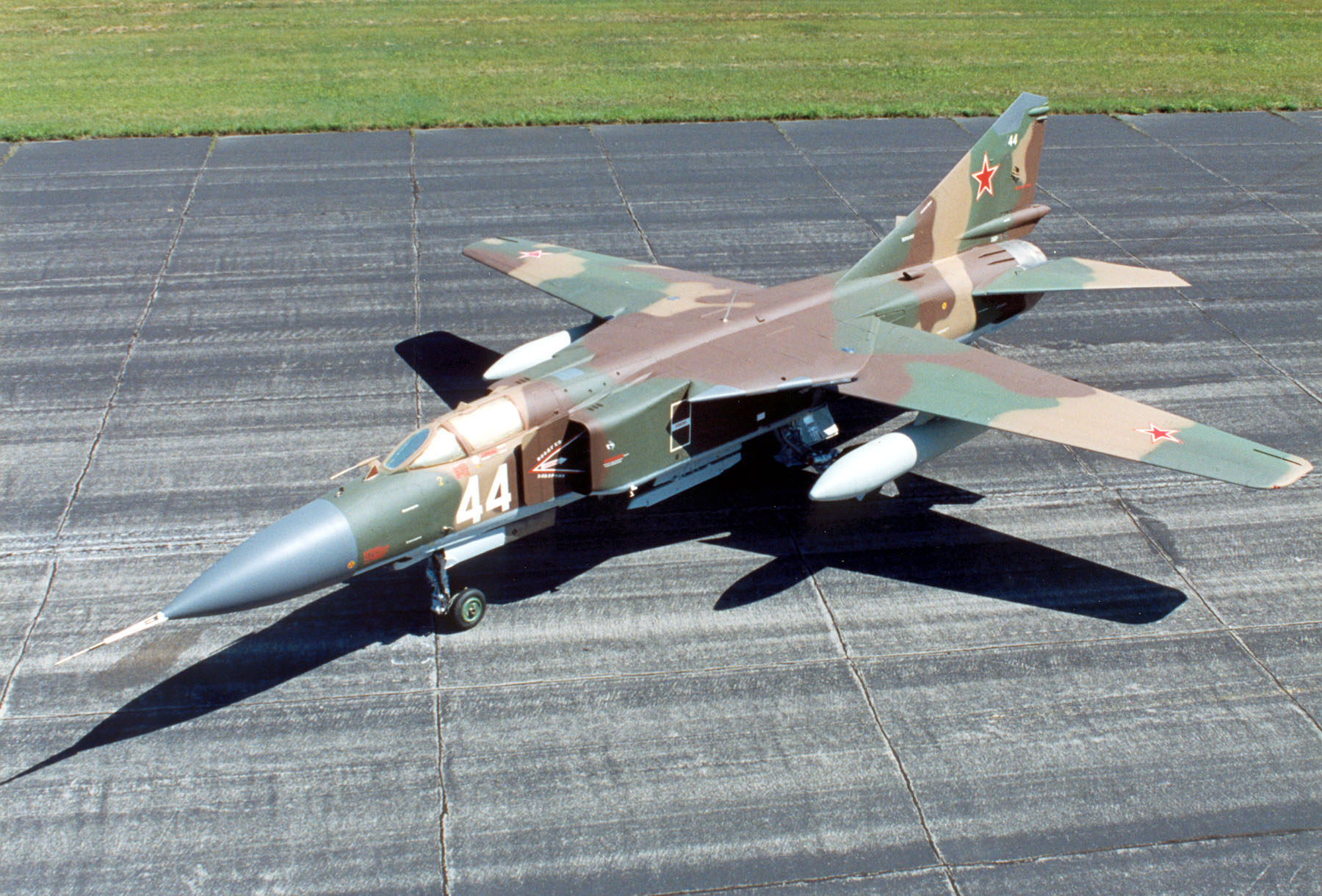
MiG-23

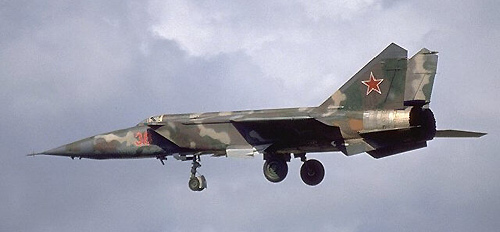
MiG-25

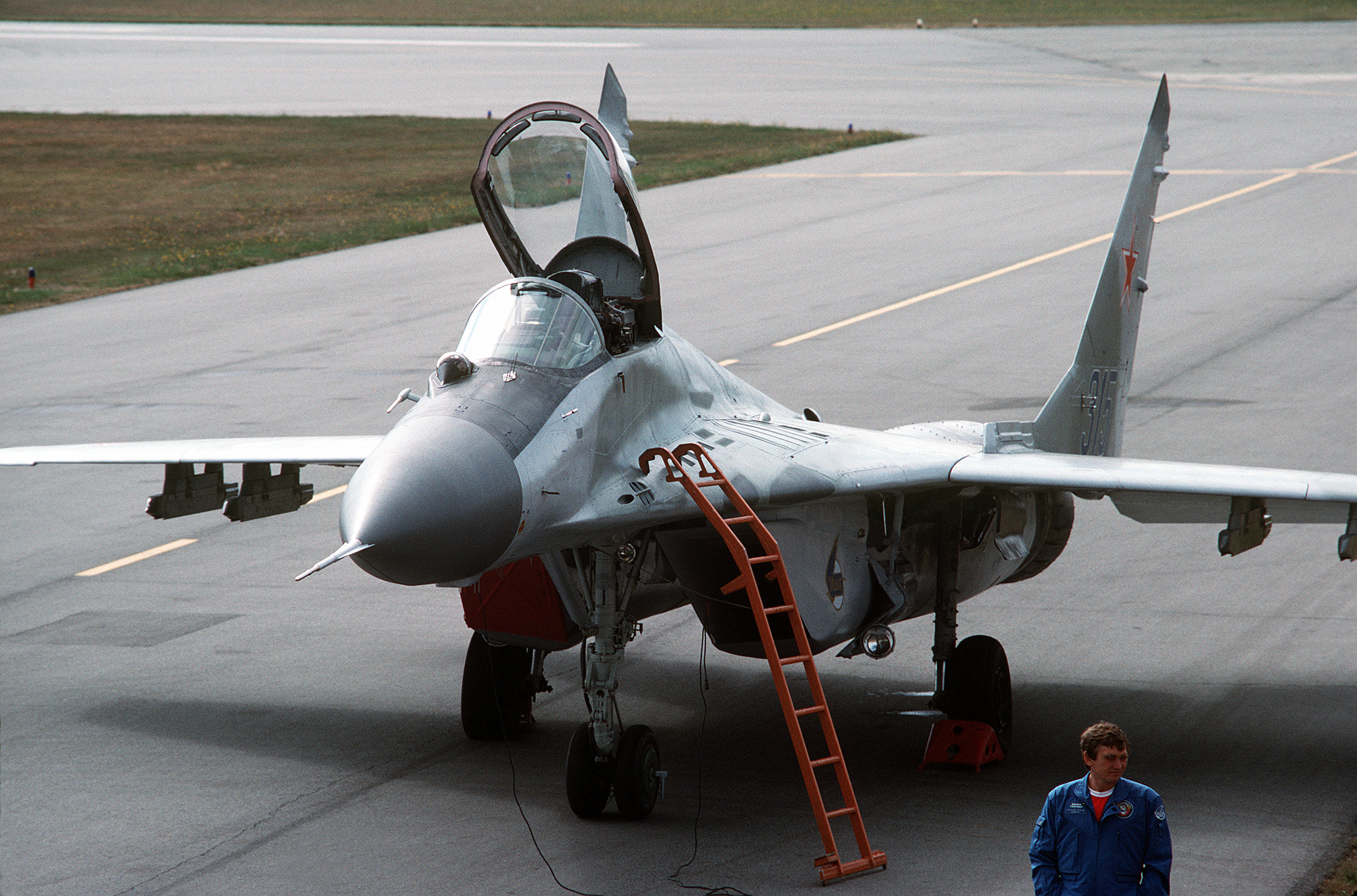
MiG-29

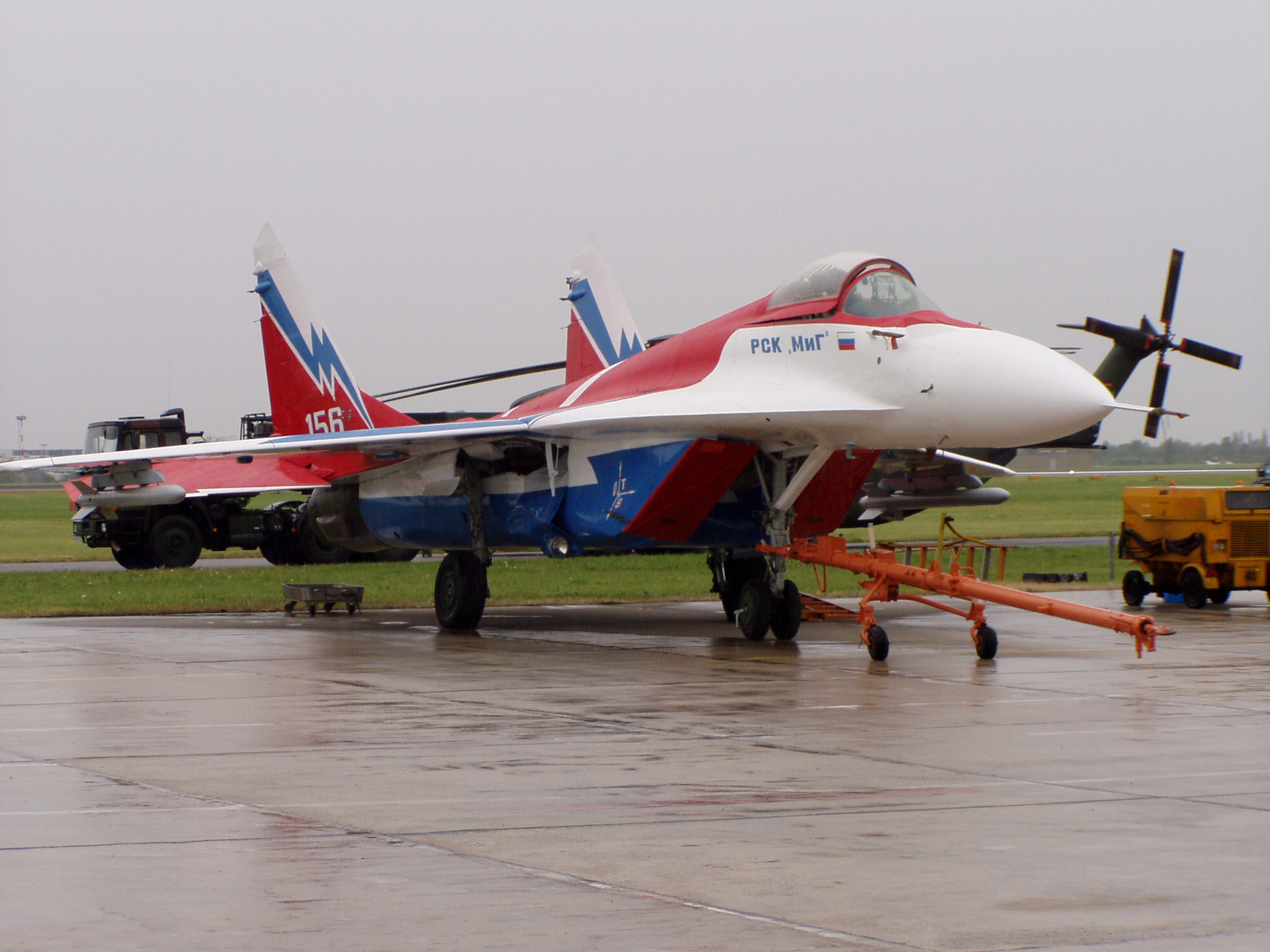
MiG-29OVT

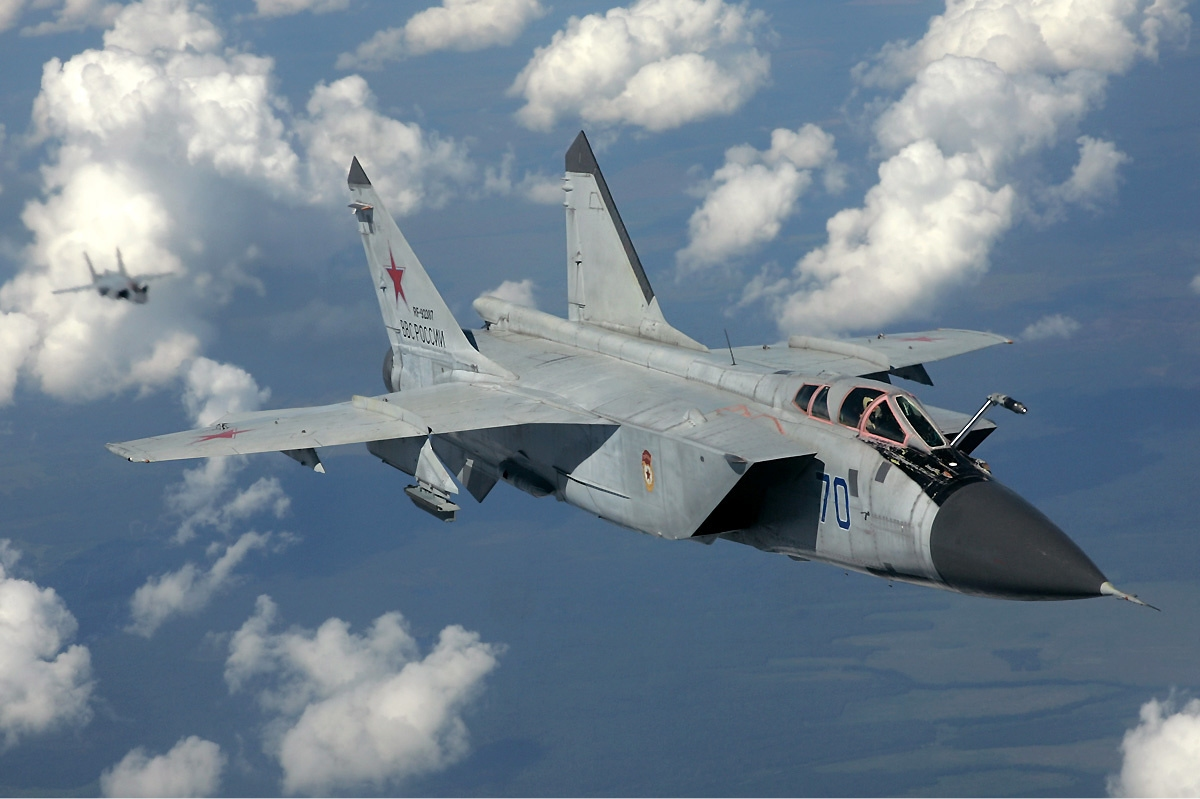
MiG-31

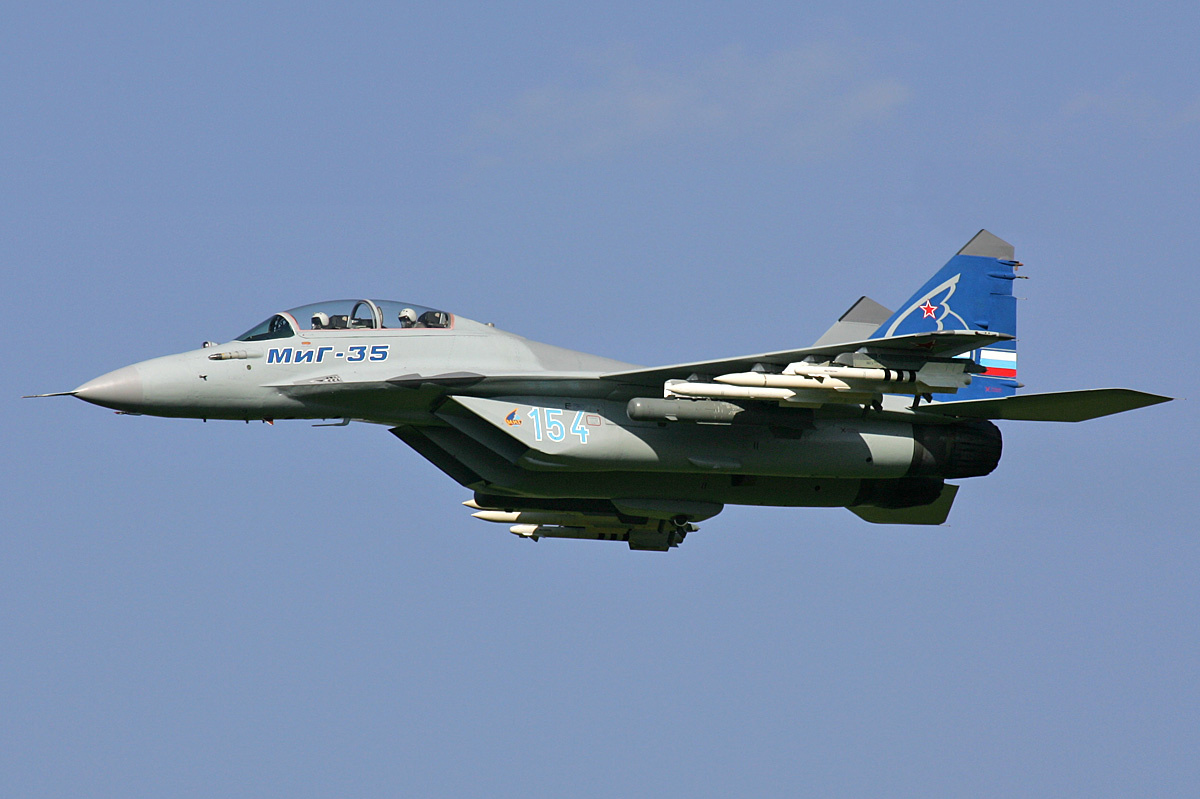
MiG-35
