= Patriot Park =

Theme park in Kubinka, Moscow Oblast, Russia

Federal State Autonomous Institution ‘Patriot’ – the Central Military-Patriotic Culture and Leisure Park of the Armed Forces of the Russian Federation
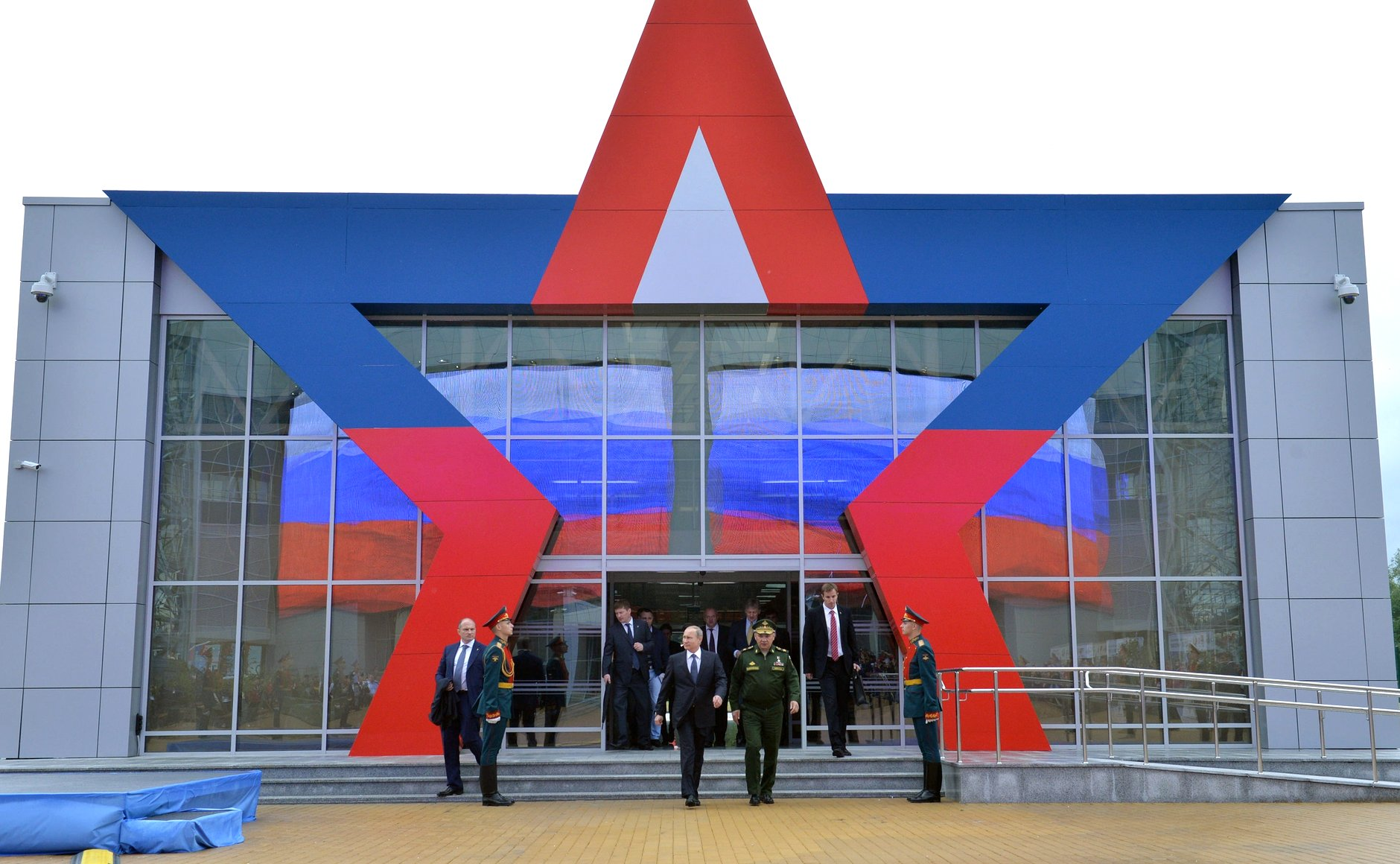
- Interactive map of Federal State Autonomous Institution ‘Patriot’ – the Central Military-Patriotic Culture and Leisure Park of the Armed Forces of the Russian Federation
- Status: Operating
- Theme: Military
- Area: 5,414 ha (13,380 acres)
- Website: Official website

Kubinka, Moscow Oblast, Russia
- Coordinates: 55°33′57.5″N 36°42′56″E
- Opened: 2016

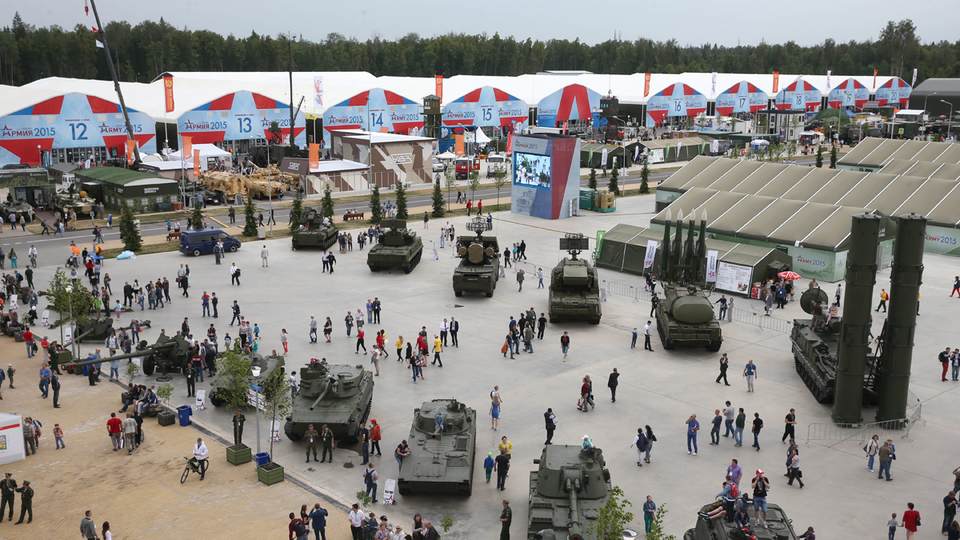
A soft opening of the park during Army-2015

Patriot Park (Russian: Парк «Патриот») is a theme park in Kubinka, Russia, that is themed around equipment of the Russian Armed Forces and the Soviet Union's victory in World War II. The park, which officially opened in 2016, is designed around a military theme, and includes interactive exhibits with military equipment (including a mini-Reichstag to storm).

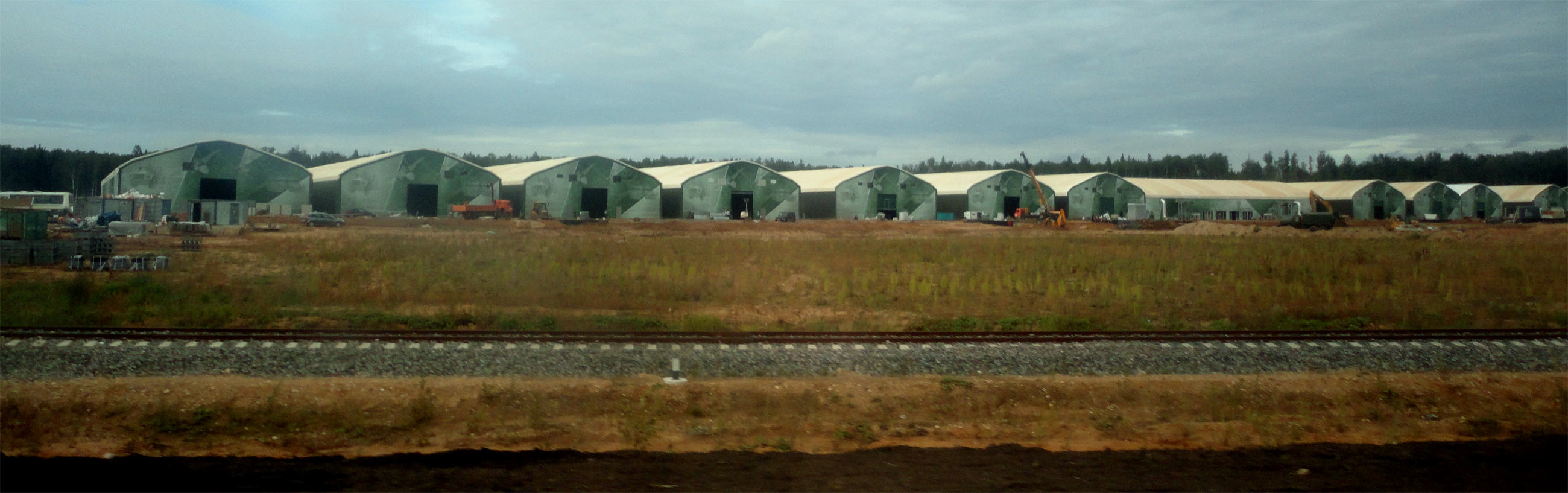
Patriot Park site N1 in 2016

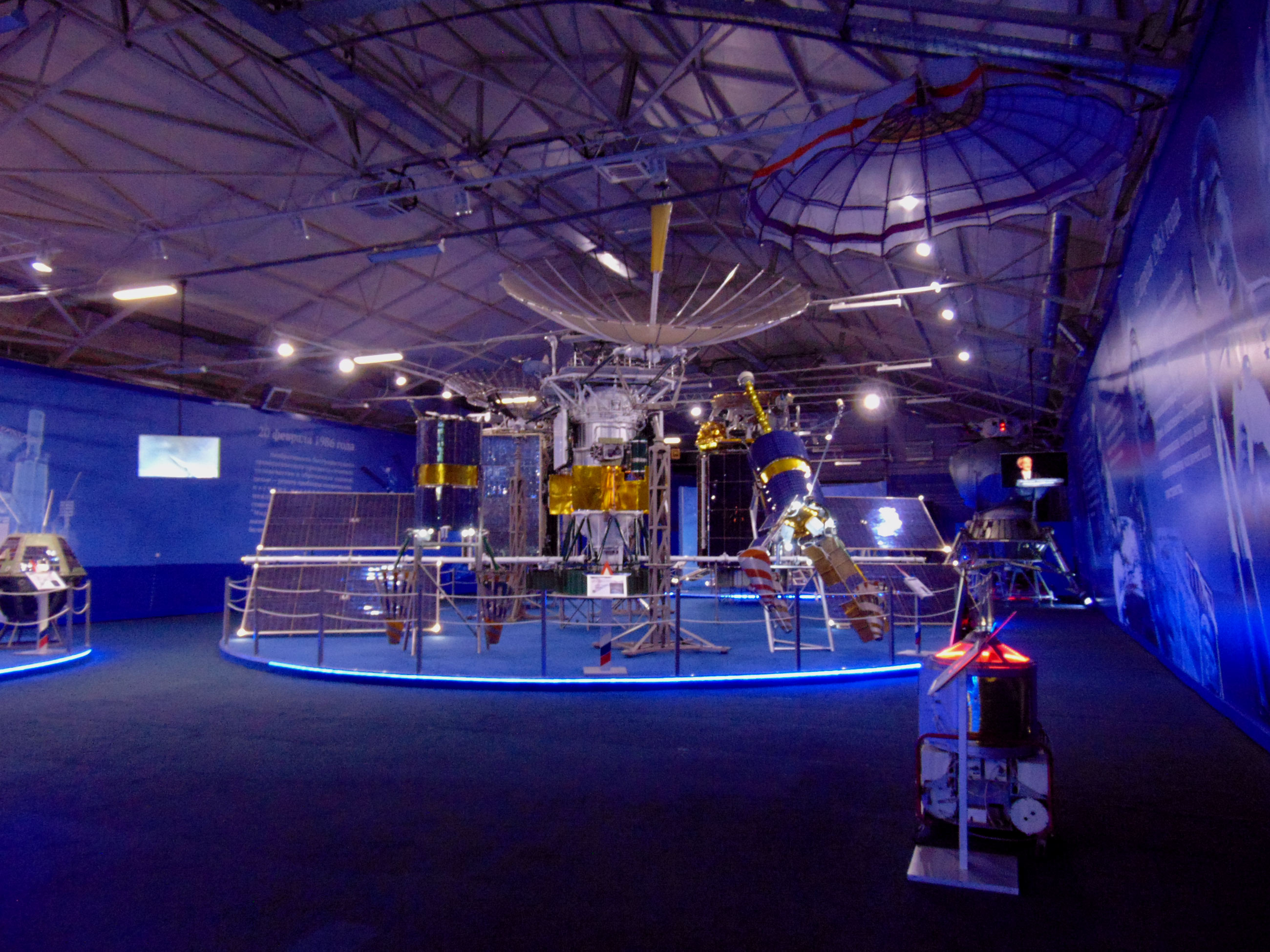
Patriot Park Military Space Hall

The concept and management of Patriot Park changed frequently. The exhibits of the tank museum were located in 7 powerful Soviet pavilions by armored vehicles category in progress, so that specialists could see the development. Initially, only 14 light summer hangars were installed in Patriot Park. One hangar housed armored vehicles of World War II of all countries, corresponding to a given period: 1941, 1942, 1943, 1944-45. This roughly corresponded to the "Battle of Moscow", "Battle of Stalingrad", "Battle of Kursk" and "Battle of Berlin". One hangar was dedicated to military space, another to airborne armored vehicles. Another hangar was dedicated to the war with Japan. Later, a hangar with trophies from the war in Syria was added. The large outdoor exhibition received new exhibits from other museums and military units. Over time, new hangars were built and the exposition changed.

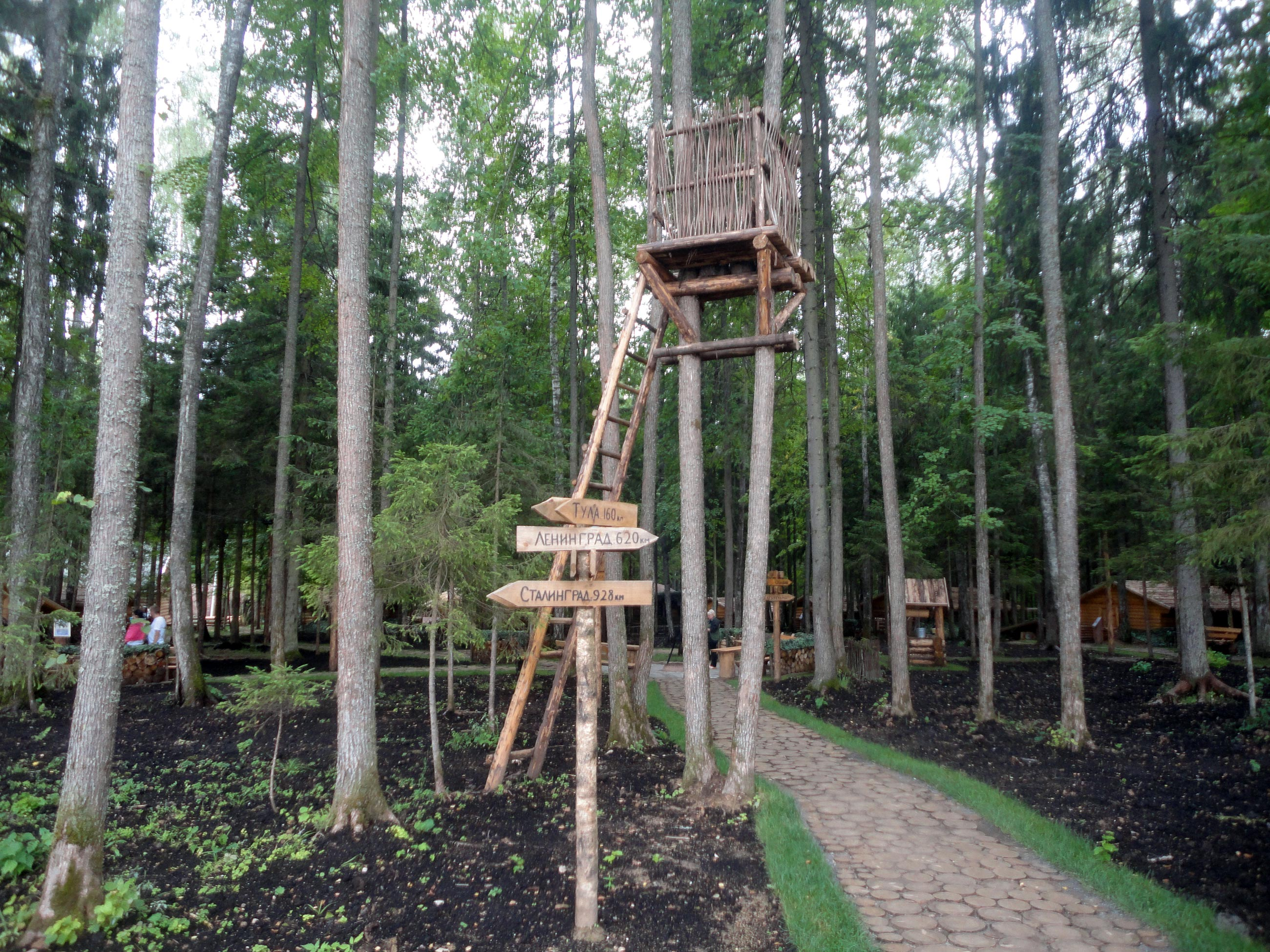
Guerrilla Village (Patriot Park)

The next area of Patriot Park was the "Partisan Village" (WW2 Guerrilla Village). A base for partisans of a large unit, it includes more than twenty dugouts, an observation post, a kitchen, a stable and a training center for saboteurs. All objects were made in accordance with the Military Regulations and instructions, authentically, by soldiers of the local garrison. The exhibit items were taken from local military units, as was the food. Several objects differ from the real ones, as they were made for commercial purposes. The fee for visiting is taken separately or included in the complex ticket.

At first, it was planned to move all exhibits from the Central Air Force Museum in Monino to Patriot Park. Some exhibits were transported without problems. But moving giant strategic bombers definitely caused their breakdown. The Ministry of Culture threatened the Ministry of Defense with criminal liability for damaging especially valuable exhibits. As a result, this decision was cancelled. Only aircraft from military units began to arrive at Patriot Park. The park incorporates the Aviation Museum of the Kubinka air base and the Kubinka Tank Museum. In 2020, the Main Cathedral of the Russian Armed Forces was completed and plans for an Armed Force Museum are in progress.

The park has hosted International Military-Technical Forum "Army" since 2015.

On 5 August 2024, the park's head, Vyacheslav Akhmedov, was arrested along with defence ministry official Major General Vladimir Shesterov on charges of embezzling its funds. On August 29, General of the Army Pavel Popov was detained for misappropriating funds intended for the Patriot Park to renovate his personal proprieties.

== Specifications ==
- Total land area – 5,414 hectares (54.14 km^{2})
- Military base – 3,530 hectares (35.3 km^{2})
- Civilian part – 1,884 hectares (18.84 km^{2})
- Maximum planned attendance is 20,000 visitors

The shooting range inside Patriot Park has an area of over 160 hectares (1.6 km^{2}) and 32 shooting bays:

- One 1400 m long shooting bay
- 21 shooting bays of 300 m length
- 10 shooting bays of 50 m length

The entire shooting range is more than 2,500 m wide, and each bay has a stand with seats for spectators and participants. There are also firearm storage facilities, changing rooms and a restaurant. The total grandstand capacity is over 2,000 people.

== See also ==
- Center for Advanced Unmanned Technologies "Rubicon"
