= Ilyushin Il-112 =

Military transport aircraft under development

Il-112
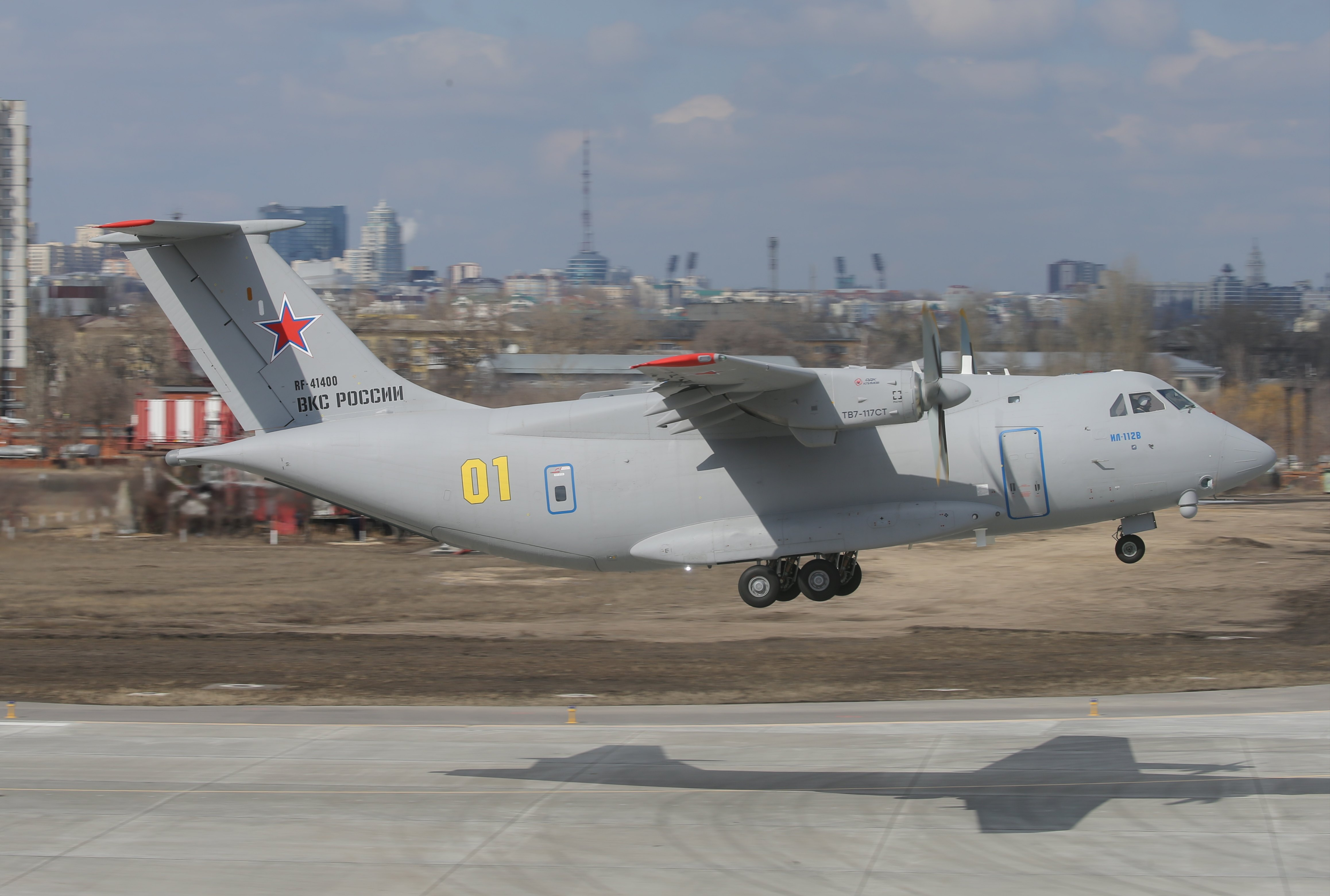
- An Il-112 during flight testing in March 2021

General information
- Type: Light military transport
- National origin: Russia
- Designer: Ilyushin
- Built by: Voronezh Aircraft Production Association
- Status: In development
- Primary user: Russian Aerospace Forces
- Number built: 2 Il-112V prototypes, only 1 flew

History
- Introduction date: 2023 (planned)
- First flight: 30 March 2019

The Ilyushin Il-112/Il-212 (Russian: Ил-112) is a high-wing light military transport aircraft being developed by Ilyushin Aviation Complex (JSC IL) for air landing and airdrop of military air cargo, equipment and personnel. The aircraft is manufactured by Voronezh Aircraft Production Association in Voronezh.

In October 2023, according to a source inside the Russian industrial-military complex, it was reported that the Il-112 project will be redesigned and renamed into the Ilyushin Il-212, the main difference being that now the aircraft will be equipped with turbofan instead of turboprop.

== Development ==
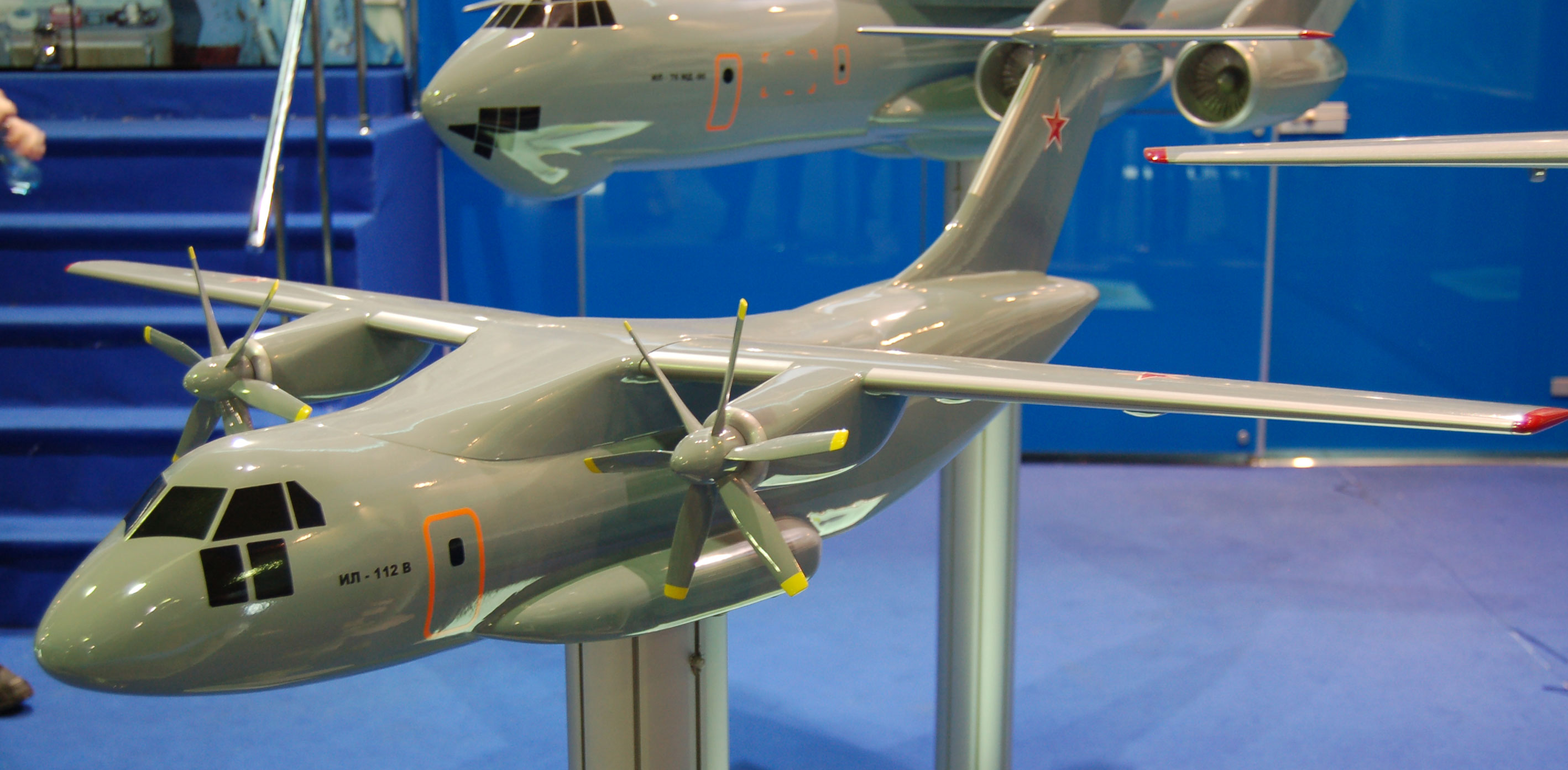
Model of Il-112V at 2009 MAKS

Work began on the Il-112 project in 1994, for both civil and military roles, including as a 40-seat airliner and cargo versions with a rear loading ramp to replace the Antonov An-26. The project was announced at the 1995 Paris Air Show where a model was exhibited. The military transport version, the Il-112V, was entered into a Russian Ministry of Defence competition to replace the Antonov An-26, the Yakovlev Yak-40 and the Let L-410 in Russian service, being evaluated against designs from Sukhoi (the Su-80) and Mikoyan (the MiG-110). The Il-112 was ordered into full development on 8 April 2003, with the type planned to enter service in 2008. It was required to carry a cargo of 6,000 kg (13,000 lb) over a distance of 3,000 km (1,600 nmi; 1,900 mi). A market of up to 120 aircraft for the Russian military and 120 civil sales was estimated in 2004.

In May 2010, with the funds allocated for development exhausted and no sign of a prototype, the Russian Defence Ministry cancelled the development contract, and in May 2011 decided to purchase seven Antonov An-140T cargo aircraft produced by Aviakor in Samara, Russia.

On October 16, 2012, Dmitry Rogozin, in India at the meeting of the Russian-Indian intergovernmental commission on trade-economic, scientific-technical and cultural cooperation, said that "Russia intends to offer India's involvement in the production of Il-112. We have brought to mind, to establish the technical documentation of the project is the development of the aircraft Ilyushin KB. And we're going to, among other projects, to offer India to take part in this project."

In January 2013 it was announced that in late December, the Main Commander of the Russian Air Force presented to the Minister of Defense Sergei Shoigu the case for a resumption of the Il-112 project. On 24 June 2013 it was reported that the Il-112 is considered as a replacement for the Antonov An-26 and Antonov An-32 in export, and on 26 June, that the Ilyushin Design Bureau sent JSC Klimov a request for the establishment of a new turboprop engine. In August 2013, the general designer of Ilyushin, Viktor Livanov, citing the First Deputy Defense Minister Yuri Borisov, confirmed that work on the aircraft has been resumed. A new contract was signed by Sergey Shoygu, the Russian Minister of Defence, on 14 November 2014. Flight tests were to begin in 2017 and production in 2019. The performance requirements were considerably reduced, with the aircraft now required to carry 5,000 kg (11,000 lb) of cargo over a distance of 1,200 km (650 nmi; 750 mi).

On 10 August 2015, the United Aircraft Corporation (UAC) announced that the first production-standard Ilyushin Il-112V transport aircraft is set to roll off the line at Voronezh Aircraft Production Plant (Russian acronym VASO) in the first half of 2017. Yury Borisov, a Russian deputy minister of defense, said the aircraft is also scheduled to make its first flight in 2017. On 2 November 2015, Yuri Slyusar, president of United Aircraft Corporation (UAC) announced that the Il-112V will make its maiden flight in July 2017.

On 20 June 2016, Andrey Kapustin the managing director of Aviastar-SP, said that the Ulyanovsk-based aircraft-maker will produce elements for the second experimental Il-112 prototype before the end of 2016. On 11 November 2016, Russia's Concern Radio-Electronic Technologies (KRET) announced that it is developing a new on-board defense system (ODS) for the Ilyushin Il-112V. The ODS is based on the President-S ODS that is designed to protect aircraft from being hit by anti-aircraft missiles and artillery. The defense system is currently installed on the Ka-52, Mi-28 and Mi-26 helicopters.

On 3 February 2017, Russia's Deputy Prime Minister, Dmitry Rogozin reiterated that the first flight of the developmental aircraft of the Il-112 will be around the middle of 2017. On 20 June 2017, Ilyushin Chief Designer Nikolai Talikov stated that the first flight will most likely be rescheduled to beginning of 2018.

On 18 January 2018, the first prototype of the IL-112V was shown at the Voronezh Joint Stock Aircraft Manufacturing Company (VASO). It has two improved Klimov TV7-117ST turboprop engines, with 2,610 kW (3,500 hp) each, each powering six-bladed AV-112 constant-speed reversible pitch propellers. It is fitted with a monolithic, single-piece wing. The aircraft is 25.15 m long, with a height of 8.89 m and a wing span of 27.6 m.

Russian unmanned air system developer Kronstadt Group partnered with Ilyushin to develop an autonomous aircraft demonstrator based on the Il-112. Emerged after the bankruptcy of the Transas Group, St. Petersburg-based Kronstadt is developing the medium-sized Orion UAV, unveiled at the July 2017 MAKS air show.

In July 2023, it was reported by RIA Novosti that the initial turboprop Il-112 project had changed. The new plan was for Ilyushin to develop a variant of the aircraft with a turbofan, renamed the Ilyushin Il-212, which will be designed on the basis of the Il-112. The Il-212 will retain the fuselage, onboard equipment, and avionics from its predecessor. However, the new aircraft will receive Russian-made jet engines: the PD-8, being a derivative of the PD-14 engine. In addition, the aircraft will be equipped with updated landing gear, a new fuel system, and a new hydraulic system. In July, 2025, the official word was that PD-8 certification was expected by the end of the year. Four production engines were also anticipated to be completed by the end of 2025, with deliveries to first go to the SJ-100 program by Spring of 2026, and with engine production eventually ramping up to 30 per year. On 5 June 2026, type certification for the PD-8 was granted by the Russian Federal Air Transport Agency.

== Design ==
The aircraft was designed to operate in adverse weather conditions and is expected to meet all current ICAO noise and emissions requirements.

The Il-112 has similar weights and dimensions to the An-26 it is intended to replace but differs by having a notably larger cabin cross-section, allowing it to accommodate 44 armed soldiers instead of 38. Thanks to the engine's reduced specific fuel consumption, which is down by 38 percent, the Il-112 has twice the ferry range, at 5,200 km (2,808 nm). The crew is reduced from six to two thanks to modern avionics and onboard equipment.

The Il-112V is equipped with the avionics combining the entire equipment complexes and systems into an integrated complex – the onboard equipment integrated complex. All aviation information as well as information on the operation of aircraft systems is displayed on six LCD monitors (digital cockpit).

== Operational history ==
The first prototype of the Il-112V was rolled out on 27 November 2018. It is intended for performance and flight handling trials. Taxi trials had begun by the end of December 2018.

The aircraft performed its first flight on 30 March 2019, after which it was grounded for modifications to reduce its weight. The first prototype had weight reductions of 800 kg (1,800 lb) applied, while the second and third flying examples are expected to be 2,000 kg (4,400 lb) lighter still. Runway repairs at VASO's airfield delayed further flight testing, which did not resume until 30 March 2021.

In October 2020, Russian Minister of Industry and Trade Denis Manturov had announced that the two flying prototype aircraft would be delivered to the Defense Ministry in 2021, and that the first serial production units should arrive to the Russian Aerospace Forces in 2023. This did not happen: the first flying prototype crashed and the second was not completed.

== Accidents and incidents ==
On 17 August 2021, the only flying prototype Il-112V (RF-41400) suffered a fire in the right engine and crashed near Kubinka Airfield. All three crew on board were killed, including test-pilots Nikolai Kuimov (Hero of the Russian Federation) and Dmitry Komarov (Honored Test Pilot).

== Variants ==
Il-112V
Military variant (cancelled)
Il-112T
Civil variant (cancelled)
Il-212
New variant of the aircraft with PD-8 jet engines, an updated landing gear, and new fuel and hydraulic systems.

== Specifications ==

Data from Ilyushin

General characteristics

- Capacity: 5,000 kg (11,000 lb); 44 passengers
- Length: 24.15 m (79 ft 3 in)
- Wingspan: 27.6 m (90 ft 7 in)
- Height: 8.89 m (29 ft 2 in)
- Wing area: 65 m^{2} (700 sq ft)
- Max takeoff weight: 21,000 kg (46,297 lb)
- Fuel capacity: 7,200 L (1,600 imp gal; 1,900 US gal)
- Powerplant: 2 × Klimov TV7-117ST turboprop, 2,610 kW (3,500 hp) each
- Propellers: 6-bladed constant-speed reversible pitch propellers

Performance

- Cruise speed: 450 km/h (280 mph, 240 kn) to 500 km/h (310 mph; 270 kn)
- Range: 2,400 km (1,500 mi, 1,300 nmi) with 3,500 kg (7,700 lb) load; 1,700 km (1,100 mi; 920 nmi) with max load
- Service ceiling: 7,600 m (24,900 ft)

== See also ==
Aircraft of comparable role, configuration, and era

- Alenia C-27J Spartan
- Antonov An-132
- EADS CASA C-295
