= Nikolai Kuimov =

Russian test pilot (1957–2021)

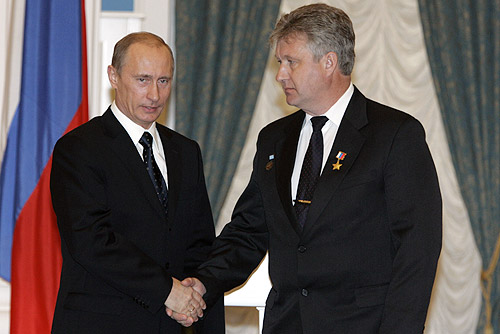
- Native name: Николай Дмитриевич Куимов
- Born: 16 December 1957; Podolsk, Moscow Oblast, Russian SFSR, Soviet Union
- Died: 17 August 2021 (aged 63) Kubinka, Moscow Oblast, Russia
- Buried: Federal Military Memorial Cemetery
- Allegiance: Soviet Union; Russia
- Branch: Aviation
- Rank: Lieutenant colonel
- Awards: Hero of the Russian Federation; Order of Courage; Honoured Test Pilot of Russia

Nikolai Dimitriyevich Kuimov (Russian: Николай Дмитриевич Куимов; 16 December 1957 – 17 August 2021) was a Russian test pilot and a Hero of the Russian Federation.

Kuimov studied as a pilot before specialising in test pilot duties, and after a period at the Chkalov State Flight Test Centre, joined the Ilyushin Design Bureau. He became Ilyushin's chief test pilot, testing many of their new designs, including the Il-76, Il-86, Il-96, Il-114, and Il-103. He made many of the first flights of new aircraft designs and exhibited them at international airshows. In addition to the award of the title of Hero of the Russian Federation, he was an Honoured Test Pilot of Russia, prior to his death in 2021 when the Il-112V he was flying crashed short of the runway at Kubinka airfield.

== Early life and career ==
Kuimov was born on 16 December 1957 in Podolsk, Moscow Oblast, then part of the Russian Soviet Socialist Federative Republic, in the Soviet Union. He was drafted into the Soviet Army in 1975, and studied at the Tambov Higher Military Aviation School of Pilots, graduating in 1979. He served in combat units of the Soviet Air Force, being deployed to Vladimirovka airbase in Astrakhan Oblast. He started out as a co-pilot, and rose to be a squadron commander, flying the Tupolev Tu-16.

In 1981, at the request of the Chkalov State Flight Test Centre, he was enrolled in the third year of the Moscow Aviation Institute's evening faculty "Takeoff" classes, graduating in 1985 with a degree in aircraft engineering and the qualification of "Mechanical Engineer". Between 1987 and 1989 Kuimov underwent further training at the Air Force Research Institute's Test Pilot Training Centre in Akhtubinsk, where he participated in tests of the An-72, An-124, and the Il-80. He was then employed by the Chkalov State Flight Test Centre as a senior test pilot between 1989 and 1994. In 1994 he joined the Ilyushin Design Bureau as a test pilot and was involved in test flights for many of their new designs, including the Il-76, Il-86, Il-96, Il-114 and Il-103.

== Achievements ==
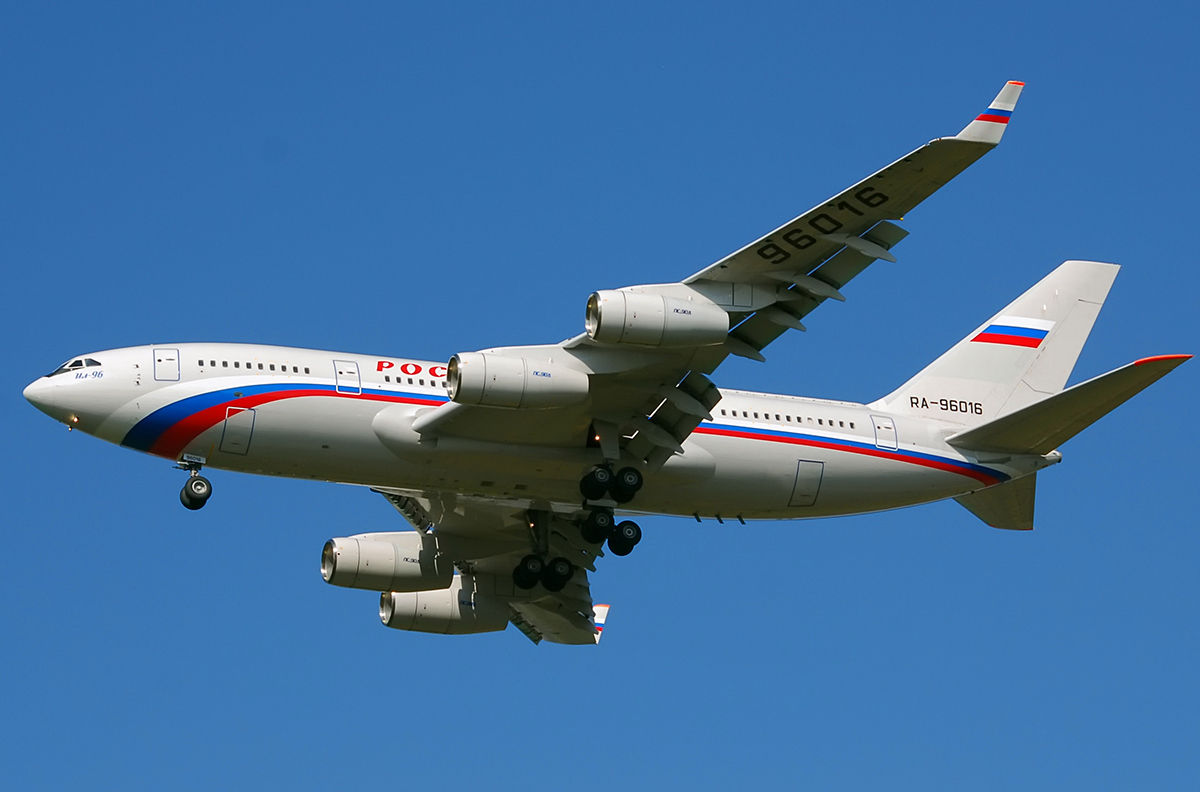
Il-96-300-PU, one of the Russian presidential aircraft. Kuimov carried out the version's first test flight, and oversaw its test flight program.

Kuimov experienced various firsts during his time as a test pilot, as well several accidents and incidents. While testing the Il-76MF transport version in 2000, the aircraft cabin was loaded with heavy plates. At 11,000 feet a plate broke loose, piercing the cabin and cutting wiring. The aircraft began to depressurise, but Kuimov and his crew were able to land the plane. In 2003 he carried out test flights of the Il-86, and made the first flight of the Il-96-300-PU, a special variant for use as the Russian presidential aircraft. Kuimov went on to conduct the Il-96-300-PU's entire test flight program. He also carried out the Il-96-300's test flight program, including the first automatic landing of the plane in 2004. Other achievements included firing missiles at sea targets from the Il-38 in 2005, and the first flight of the Il-76MD-90 prototype that same year. He went on to make the first flights of other Ilyushin developments, including the Il-96-400TD in 2007, and the IL-76MF in 2010. On 30 March 2019 he piloted the first flight of the Il-112V, calling the plane "excellent". He also carried out the first flight of the Il-114-300 on 16 December 2020.

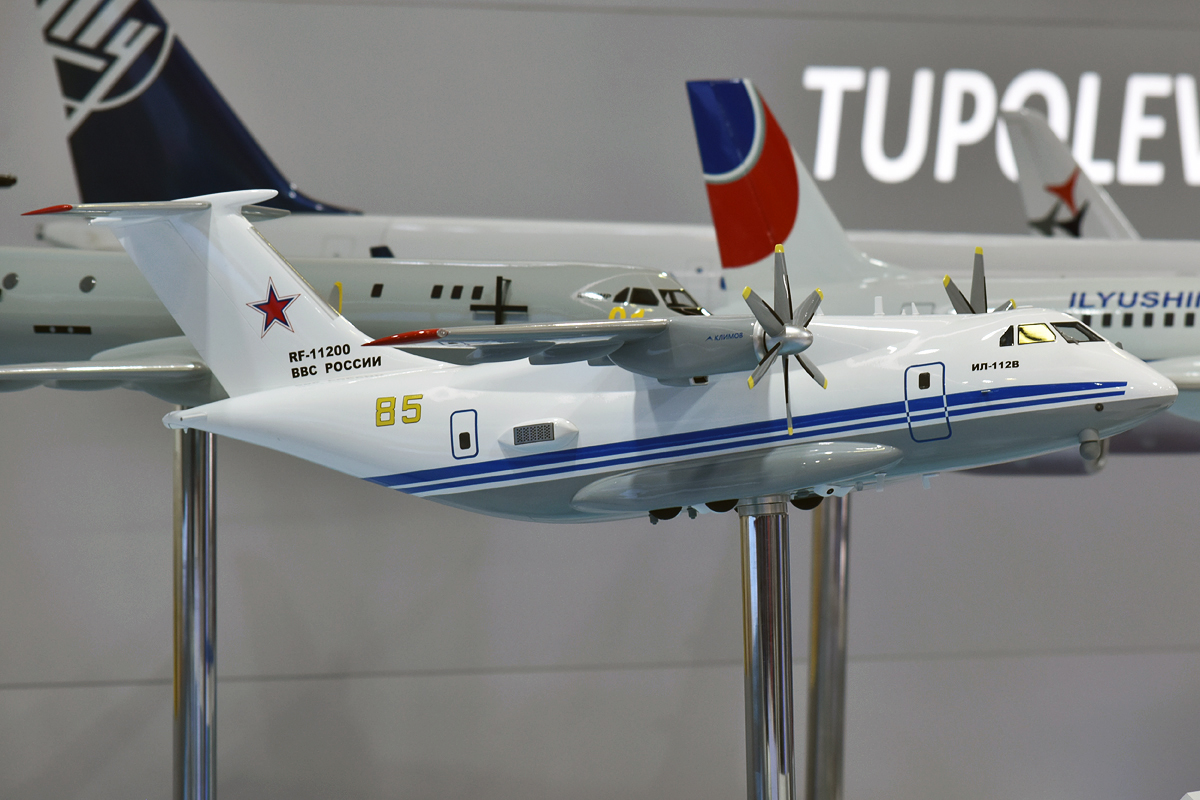
A model of the Il-112V. Kuimov carried out the first test flight of the aircraft in 2019, and was killed flying it on later tests in 2021.

On 28 December 2006 Kuimov was awarded the title of Hero of the Russian Federation "for courage and heroism during the testing of aviation equipment." Over his career Kuimov was rated to fly more than 35 types of aircraft. He took part in air shows and exhibitions, flying the Il-96T at the 1997 Paris Air Show, the Il-76MF at the 1998 ILA Berlin Air Show, and the Il-114-100 at the 2000 Changi International Airshow in Singapore. He had received the award of Honoured Test Pilot of Russia on 8 May 2003.

== Death ==
Kuimov died on 17 August 2021 when the Il-112V prototype he was flying crashed 2 kilometres (1.2 mi) short of the runway at Kubinka airfield at 11:18 Moscow time. Preliminary reports indicate the right engine had caught fire prior to the crash. The crew of three; Kuimov, test pilot Dmitry Komarov and flight engineer Nikolai Khludeyev, were all killed. The three were buried at the Federal Military Memorial Cemetery on 31 August 2021, the same day they were each posthumously awarded the Order of Courage.
