= Sky Hussars =

The Sky Hussars (Russian: Небесные Гусары, Nebesnye Gusary, "Celestial Hussars") is an aerobatic team of aviation training flight crews of the Russian Air Force. It is formed on the basis of the 3rd Air Squadron of the 234th Guards Fighter Aviation Regiment(GFAR) (Known in Russian as ЦПАТ ВВС России им. И. Н. Кожедуба, TsPAT VVS Rossii im. I. N. Kozheduba, "Aircraft Display Center of the Russian Air Force named after I. N. Kozhedub"), in 1989. The color scheme and the name of the team appeared on Su-25 aircraft in 1991. The Sky Hussars became one of the world's first aerobatic teams that are purely made up of ground-attack aircraft.

Aerobatics Group The Sky Hussars 237th Central Aviation Technical Squadron
Years Active	1991-1997 2000-2005
Country	USSR → Russia
Branch of	Russian Air Force
Base	Kubinka, Moscow Oblast
Coloring scheme	Red, White, Blue
Aircraft	Attack Aircraft: Su-25 (6, since 1991, 4 since 1995, 2 since 1997) Training Aircraft: Albatros L-39 (since 2000) Fighter: MiG-29 (from 2003)

== History ==
The Sky Hussars could trace its lineage from the 234th GFAR of Kubinka. Despite the fact that this regiment was a combat-ready squadron in the structure of the Air Force, aerobatic pilots had always been among the priorities. The Regiment, in full force, participated in parades held in Tushino Airfield. Pilots of the GFAR not only practiced tasks of aerobatic maneuvers, but also engaged in aerial and air-to-ground sorties. Their performance had been seen by a variety of delegations visiting Kubinka, including the military representatives from NATO. The load on the pilots skyrocketed as the regiment was to provide training flight personnel to the central part of the Air Force. A solution was found by the transferring the Regiment to the 4th Squadron. On March 4, 1969, the 234th GFAR was integrated into the 4th Squadron, which was granted the status of an aerobatic team on 7 June 1974. This date is considered the unofficial day of birth of The Sky Hussars. In fact, this 4th Squadron became the first Soviet aerobatic team operating military aircraft to be officially recognized. Pilots of the 4th Squadron flew MiG-21 and MiG-23s, in which they performed over 800 shows. The trend of reorganizing in the Armed Forces at the turn of the 1980s to the 1990s led to the fact that the regiment was again transferred to the 3rd Squadron, as one squadron was dissolved and the former 4th squadron went up to the 3rd. The personnel of the squadron performed in three different aircraft, varying per shift, the Su-17, Su-24 and the Su-25.

The pilots of the squadron performed around 2 to 3 shows per month, but the complexity of servicing three different types of aircraft led to the idea that it is necessary to leave the squadron the most promising export type, which was the Su-25. The choice fell on the Su-25 for its excellent strike capabilities and survivability in the War in Afghanistan.

The Su-17 and the Su-24s were transferred to other units, leaving the attack aircraft in Kubinka to be solely made up of Su-25s. Soon, by 1991, the first and second aerobatic teams, "Swifts" and "Russian Knights", and later The Sky Hussars were formed.

== Personnel ==
The first composition included Aleksandr Gornov, Vladimir Galunenko, Aleksandr Bokach and Valery Kravtsov;

The second composition was made up of Aleksandr Smirnov, Aleksandr Gornov, Igor Tabunov, Gennadiy Avramenko, Vladimir Galunenko and Anatoly Arestov.

Parade formation in 1995 was made up of Valery Kravtsov, Aleksandr Smirnov, Aleksandr Gornov, Sergey Dolzhnikov, Gennadiy Avramenko, Takhir Khasanov and Yuri Zavolokin.

== Features ==
The training of the Su-25 pilots of the 3rd Air Squadron began in April 1989. Evaluating of the flight characteristics of the aircraft, commander of the first squadron's commander, Lt. Col. Alexsandr Gornov noted that certain complex aerobatic maneuvers could be successfully performed given the skills of the pilots, although, by definition, the Su-25 was not originally designed to do air combat maneuvers.

The aircraft, without assistance in managing the course and pitch automatically, imposed heavy loads on controlling the aircraft, and the R-95Sh engines of the aircraft was never fitted with afterburners, therefore unable "to differ high-intake and high-torque". But in experienced hands, if the aircraft was unable to create miracles, then at least the maneuver could pretend to be elegant. Freed from the burden of combat aircraft performing loops and ascending barrels, the pilots began preparing the team in the formation of a rhombus. The Su-25 was never considered a platform for aerobatics from the very first moment, every design detail was contrary to aerial performance, instead full concentration was put on ground attack, far from aerobatics. Many advantages of the Su-25 was put into good use for its aerobatic capabilities nonetheless.

Demonstration maneuvers require the entire group to take off, so the aircraft line up so that each one chased another. Rising in the air in formation was proved to be very difficult, due to that as soon as the nose wheel of the Su-25 leaves the ground, the aircraft would rise rapidly. Pilots were required to closely watch their teammates to prevent collision. Pilots constantly cooled the brake wheels, fearing that they would burn when braking on the runway. The normal procedure ignores this issue, but in demonstration flights this is considered inappropriate. With a thin body, the Su-25 proved to be very liable to side winds.

From a purely aerobatic view, the Su-25 is inferior to the MiG-29 and the Su-27. The Su-25 has no emergency recovery systems, requiring the pilot to carefully monitor their flight parameters. Tolerance for error was extremely poor, which greatly complicated flights in tight combat formations, as a small error in the angle-of-attack would instantly trouble the aircraft.

At low engine speeds the elevator of the aircraft lacked effectiveness to maintain the operational angle-of-attack. Some details of maneuvers turned out to be extremely difficult for the pilots not only technically, but also psychologically. A speed of about 300 km/h was maintained when conducting a loop maneuver, which would cause the aircraft to stall. This required high skills from the pilots to not fall into an inverted spin. It is very difficult to do a barrel roll and conduct it in sync with the entire group, even though it seems easy from the ground. Piloting the Su-25 demanded high skill from the pilot.

== Creation of the pilot group ==
The aerobatic teams established on the basis of the 1st and 2nd squadrons already had their own names and symbols. Several proposals were raised for the 3rd group. The first one suggested the name "Ants", while the commanding squadron favored "Fugitive Hussars", but got rejected. The name "Grizzlies" also came up, but wasn't accepted because of the direct allusion to the Russia-North American relationship. It was then the commander of aviation of the Moscow Military District, Lt. Gen. Antoshkin proposed the name of "Celestial Hussars" that satisfied everyone. Coloring scheme was soon hammered down to white, blue and red, and a patterned buckle pelisse was painted at the bottom of the fuselage. The emblem was a circle on a white background, with for attack aircraft in a diamond formation, and the crossed hussar sabers directly, the "Celestial Hussars, Kubinka" inscription was put on the edges of the circle. The new scheme was shown on the Su-25s to the audience on 12 April 1992, at the "Aviadvigateli-92" international exhibition held in Kubinka.

== Performance ==
The Sky Hussars toured in the Khabarovsk region in 1992, where the airport housed the Pad-based Assault Regiment, which fought with the Normandie-Niemen during the Second World War.

The Sky Hussars appeared in MAKS-93 on September 12, 1993, and on February 23, 1994 during the celebration of the Defender of the Fatherland Day in Kubinka, and later on 4 and 23 March 1993 to perform for the foreign delegations, and on April 12, 1994 during "Dvigateli-94". The commissioning of new pilots increased the team size to five and later to six.

On May 14, 1994, the Sky Hussars split into two groups and flew head-on with each other, followed by demonstrations in the Tajik capital of Dushanbe. The season of 1994 ended on October 17, when the foreign delegations arrived in Kubinka.

As the squadron was preparing for the performance in Europe, the Ministry of Defense failed to find funds for kerosene, which halted the group.

On April 19, 1995, almost all Russian fighter squadrons paraded in Kubinka. Even the maritime aviation regiment arrived for training before the Victory Parade. On 9 May 1995, the Sky Hussars at a size of 5 flew in a column, and went around the Poklonnaya Hill that was sitting on the returen route. Then they performed at Kubinka on June 3. Soon after came the reorganization.

== Reorganization ==
The decision was made to remove the Su-25 from the shelf in 1995. The Sky Hussars were disbanded in 1997, with the aircraft transferred to the 368th Aviation Regiment in Budyonnovsk, some of which took part in the Second Chechen War, in their original coloring scheme. In 2000, new pilots came to the group, and the 3rd Squadron soon returned to their "Sky Hussars" name, and began flying L-39 training aircraft. The group received a MiG-29 in 2003, before disbanding again in 2005, providing the basis of another TsPAT squadron. The group was again revived to fly Yak-130s in 2013.
