= Mikoyan MiG-2000 =

Russian SSTO project

Mikoyan MiG-2000 was a project by Russian Aircraft Corporation MiG for a liquid ramjet single-stage-to-orbit spaceplane, explored in the 1990s. It was envisioned to have a takeoff weight of 300 tons and deliver a 9-ton payload on a 200 km low Earth orbit. The plane lost a competition to the Tupolev Tu-2000. Similar to Rockwell X-30.
