= Mikoyan MiG-110 =

Proposed aircraft

The Mikoyan-Gurevich MiG-110 (Russian: МиГ-110) was a proposed Russian passenger/cargo aircraft that began development in 1995 but was not built. It would have been a high-mounted cantilever monoplane with a pod-and-boom configuration with a beavertail rear fuselage, to be powered by two Klimov TV7-117 turboprop engines.

== Proposed variants ==
- MiG-110N – dedicated passenger version
- MiG-110NP – paramilitary version
- MiG-110M – combination passenger/freight version with all-weather and STOL capability
- MiG-110A – version for joint project, for production in Austria.

== Specifications (MiG-110M) ==
Data from

General characteristics

- Crew: 2
- Capacity: 49 pax / 5,500 kg (12,125 lb) payload
- Length: 18.5 m (60 ft 8 in)
- Wingspan: 22.12 m (72 ft 7 in)
- Max takeoff weight: 15,300 kg (33,731 lb)
- Powerplant: 2 × Klimov TV7-117 turboprop engines, 1,864 kW (2,500 hp) each
- Propellers: 6-bladed constant-speed propellers

Performance

- Cruise speed: 500 km/h (310 mph, 270 kn)
- Range: 4,050 km (2,520 mi, 2,190 nmi) with full fuel
- Service ceiling: 11,000 m (36,000 ft)

== See also ==
- List of civil aircraft
- Mikoyan-Gurevich
