= Mikoyan MiG 18-50 =

1990s unbuilt Russian airliner project

18-50

General information
- Type: regional airliner, business jet
- National origin: Russia
- Manufacturer: Mikoyan; Aviaprom
- Designer: Farukh Muhamedov; Aleksandr A. Yefimov
- Status: Cancelled project

The Mikoyan MiG 18-50 (Cyrillic Микоян МиГ 18-50) was a 1990s Russian project to develop an aircraft that could be configured as a regional airliner or as a business jet with intercontinental range. The 18-50 designation reflected these two roles, referring to the 18 seats it would have in business-jet configuration, or its 50 seats as an airliner. Mikoyan did not put the design into production, and by 1993 it was taken up by Aviaprom for further development, first as the Eurasia 18-50 (Евразия 18-50) and then evolved into an 8- to 18-seat business jet as the Aviastayer (Авиастайер).

== Design ==
The design of the 18-50 was similar to other aircraft of its type. It was designed as a low-wing, cantilever monoplane with a cruciform tail and all flying surfaces swept. Two turbofan engines were to be mounted in nacelles on the sides of the rear fuselage. It was to be equipped with retractable tricycle undercarriage.

In business jet configuration, it was to be equipped with a comprehensive communications suite including telephone and telefax systems. As an airliner, passengers would be seated four abreast, with a centre aisle. Mikoyan also considered a 75- to 100-seat version with a stretched fuselage.

== Development ==
The 18-50 project originated in collaborative design studies carried out in the late 1980s between the Tajik Aviation Association, the Saratov Aviation Factory, and the Riga Civil Aviation Engineers Institute (RKIIGA)

During the final years of the Soviet Union, aviation manufacturers came under government konversiya directives that aimed to repurpose Cold War military manufacturing capability to peaceful purposes. Business jets — termed "administrative service" (административно служебными; administrativno sluzhebnymi) aircraft — were a promising and hitherto unexplored market, and industry research indicated strong international demand for such aircraft. In 1990, Mikoyan commenced development of such an aircraft as a konversiya project, based on the previous design studies and in conjunction with the original partner organisations. This would be only one of several such designs from the Russian aerospace industry around this time. It was distinguished from its competitors not only by its communications suite, but a truly intercontinental range, and a very high level of interior comfort. Mikoyan presented the business-jet version at the Asian Aerospace 1990 airshow in Singapore. Aviation trade publication Air International judged the project to be "a good prospect for Western collaboration" in the context of the "fast disintegrating Eastern bloc."

The following year, the Soviet Ministry for the Aviation Industry created the Aviaprom organisation to co-ordinate activities across the whole aviation sector, and by July, it had become a Joint Stock Company. Mikoyan shared development of the 18-50 with this new enterprise, where it gained the new name Eurasia 18-50 By the time Aviaprom publicly exhibited the design at the 1993 Paris Air Show, it was named the Aviastayer. As the Aviastayer, it was configured for 8 to 18 passengers and its range had been extended from 10,000 kilometres (6,210 mi; 5,400 nmi) to 12,000 kilometres (7,460 mi; 6,480 nmi).

Work on the Aviastayer continued until at least 1994, when the design underwent wind-tunnel testing at TsAGI. Mikoyan's contribution to the project was conducted from the company's branch office in Dushanbe. The ongoing Tajikistani Civil War contributed to the demise of the project.

== Specifications (as designed) ==
Data from Taylor, Lambert & Munson 1993, p.288

General characteristics

- Crew: two pilots
- Capacity: 18 passengers (business jet), 50 passengers (regional airliner)
- Length: 24.90 m (81 ft 8 in)
- Wingspan: 23.30 m (76 ft 5 in)
- Height: 7.55 m (24 ft 9 in)
- Wing area: 64 m^{2} (690 sq ft)
- Empty weight: 20,200 kg (44,533 lb)
- Max takeoff weight: 36,000 kg (79,366 lb) (business jet); 39,000 kilograms (86,000 lb) (regional airliner)
- Powerplant: 2 × Lotarev D-36 turbofans, 63.74 kN (14,330 lbf) thrust each

Performance

- Cruise speed: 850 km/h (530 mph, 460 kn)
- Range: 10,000 km (6,200 mi, 5,400 nmi) (business jet); 8,400 kilometres (5,220 mi; 4,540 nmi) (regional airliner)
- Service ceiling: 12,500 m (41,000 ft) (business jet); 11,000 metres (36,100 ft) (regional airliner)
