= Klimov TV7-117 =

1990s Russian turboprop aircraft engine

TV7-117
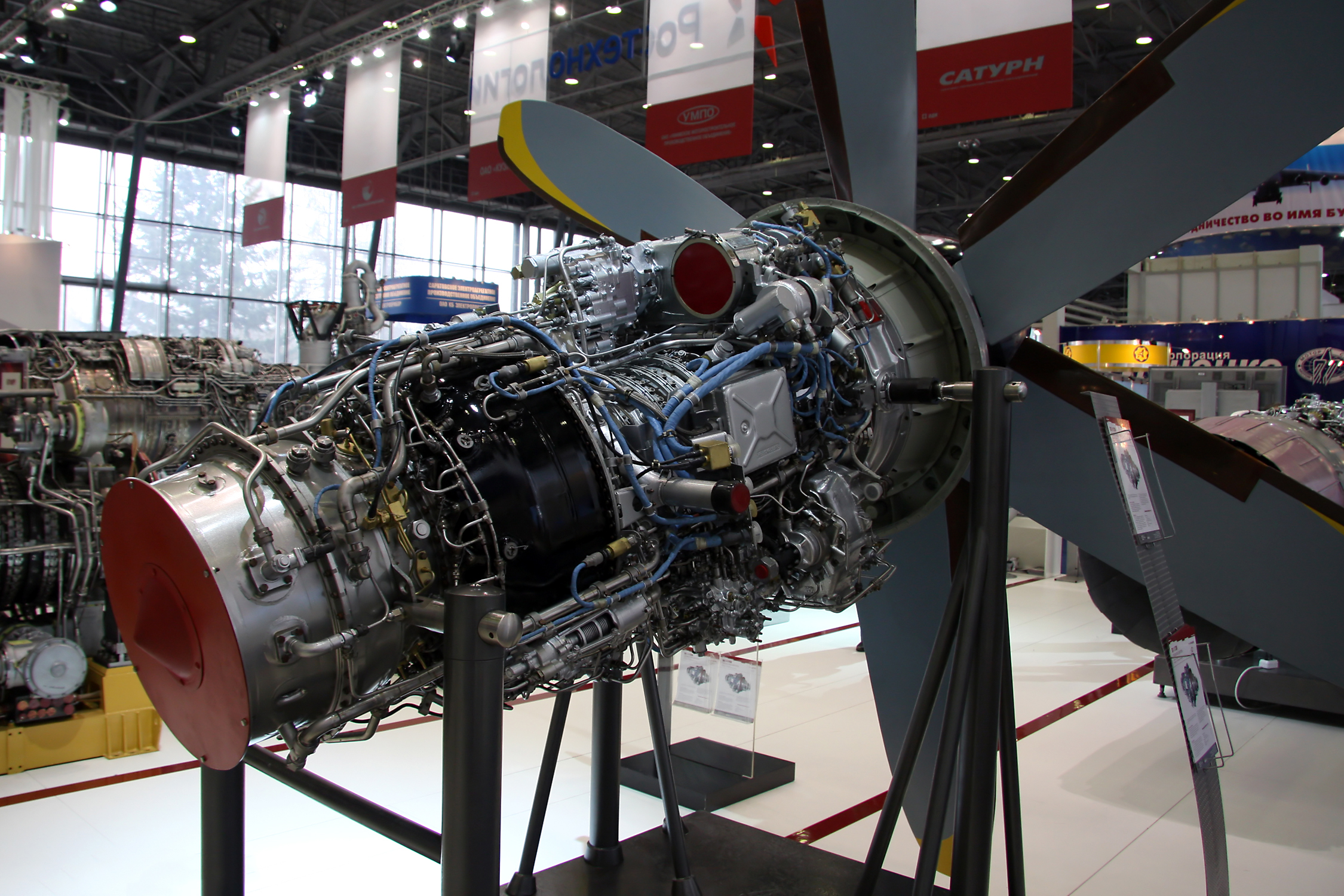
- TV7-117SM
- Type: Turboprop / Turboshaft
- National origin: Russia
- Manufacturer: Klimov, MMP Chernishev TMKB Sojuz (Tushino), OMKB, NPC Saljut
- First run: 1986
- Major applications: Ilyushin Il-112; Ilyushin Il-114; Mil Mi-38

The Klimov TV7-117 is a Russian turboprop engine certified in 1997 to power the Ilyushin Il-114 regional commuter aircraft. The new engine features enhanced reliability, fuel economy and greater service life compared to its predecessors produced in the former Soviet Union. The engine has a modular design. The nine modules can be replaced in the field, which dramatically reduces costs and accelerates repair and maintenance. The engine has an electronic-hydromechanical control system.

The TV7-117S engine has been offered to power the newest Russian turboprop aircraft such as Ilyushin Il-112 and Ilyushin Il-114. In addition, Klimov developed the TV7-117V turboshaft to power rotary-wing aircraft, such as the Mil Mi-38, and marine drives for high-speed boats and industrial electric power plants. The TV7-117 engine family is produced by Klimov JSC (St. Petersburg), Chernishov JSC (Moscow) and the Baranov JSC (Omsk) and Aerosila propellers for TV7-117S variants.

== Variants ==
- TV7-117S 2800 hp
- TV7-117SM/ST (the S stands for the Russian word for aircraft, the M for airliner, as opposed to military cargo aircraft, which are designated ST, with the T being for transport) is the turboprop variant for fixed wing aircraft, that was introduced by Klimov in 2002, featuring a Full Authority Digital Electric Control (FADEC) system based on the BARK-12 or BARK-57 electronic engine control unit, as well as improved reliability, manufacturability and maintainability. It features an enclosed centrifugal wheel that increases its power by 10% while maintaining all the other performance parameters. The Klimov Company holds a patent for the design and manufacturing of such wheels. This engine is used on the Ilyushin Il-114 and is likely to be used on the new Ilyushin Il-112. The TV7-117ST-01 used in the Il-114-300 has a take off power of up to 3,100 hp.
- TV7-117V/VM (the V stands for the Russian word for helicopter) is the turboshaft variant for helicopters, a model with the powershaft in front dedicated to the new Mi-38 (VK-3000 family).
- TV7-117VK is a version with the powershaft in the rear to upgrade Mi-28 and Ka-50/Ka-52 helicopters (VK-3000 family).
- TV7-117K naval derivative variant

== Applications ==
- Ilyushin Il-112
- Ilyushin Il-114
- Mikoyan MiG SVB (proposed, not built)
- Mil Mi-38
- TVRS-44

== Specifications (TV7-117VM) ==
Data from

==== General characteristics ====
- Type: turboprop/turboshaft
- Length: 1,614 mm (63.5 in)
- Diameter: 640–820 mm (25–32 in)
- Dry weight: 360 kg (790 lb)

==== Components ====
- Compressor: single shaft axial flow centrifugal compressor, 5 axial + 1 centrifugal stages
- Combustors: annular
- Turbine: 2-stage axial flow

==== Performance ====
- Maximum power output: 2800 hp
- Overall pressure ratio: 16 (ratio on takeoff)
- Fuel consumption: 199 g/hp/hr (takeoff)

== See also ==
Related development

- VK-800
- VK-2500

Comparable engines

- Turbomeca Makila 1A2

Related lists

- List of aircraft engines
