= Kubinka =

Town in Moscow Oblast, Russia

Kubinka Кубинка
- Town
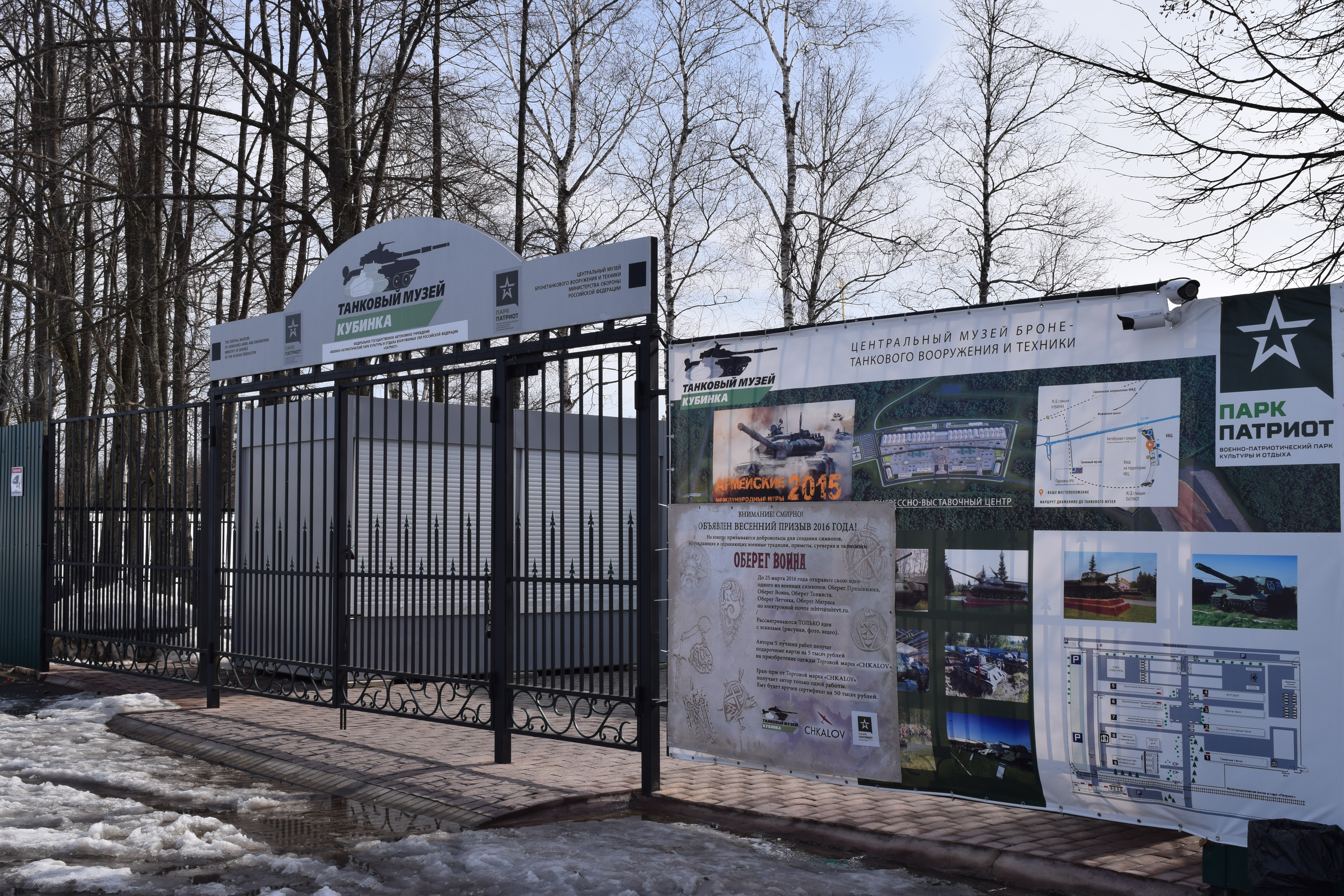
- Entrance of the Kubinka Tank Museum

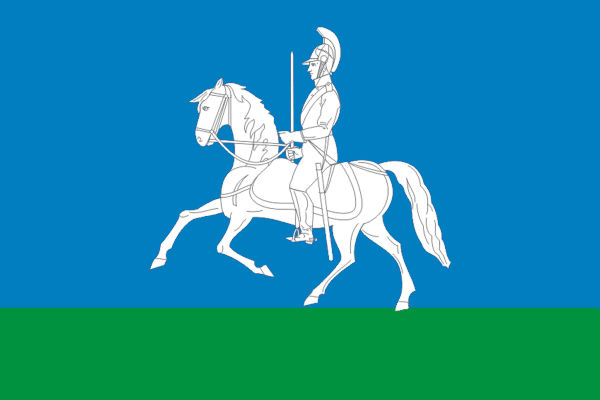
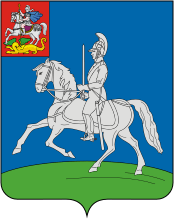
- Flag Coat of arms
- Interactive map of Kubinka
- Location of Kubinka Kubinka (Moscow Oblast)
- Coordinates: 55°34′N 36°42′E
- Country: Russia
- Federal subject: Moscow Oblast
- Administrative district: Odintsovsky District
- TownSelsoviet: Kubinka
- Founded: 15th century
- Town status since: 2004

Government
  - Mayor: Pavel Stanislavovich Zdradovskiy

Area
  - Total: 4 km^{2} (1.5 sq mi)
- Elevation: 200 m (660 ft)

Population (2010 Census)
  - Total: 22,964
  - Estimate (2025): 23,638 (+2.9%)
  - Density: 5,700/km^{2} (15,000/sq mi)

Administrative status
  - Capital of: Town of Kubinka

Municipal status
  - Municipal district: Odintsovsky Municipal District
  - Urban settlement: Kubinka Urban Settlement
  - Capital of: Kubinka Urban Settlement
- Time zone: UTC+3 (MSK)
- Postal code: 143070–143072
- Dialing code: +7 49869
- OKTMO ID: 46755000016
- Town Day: August 22
- Website: www.kubinka-info.ru

Kubinka (Russian: Ку́бинка) is a town in Odintsovsky District of Moscow Oblast, Russia, located on the Setun River, 63 kilometers (39 mi) west of Moscow. Population: 22,964 (2010 census); 26,158 (2002 census); 8,019 (1989 Soviet census).

== History ==
Kubinka, founded in the 15th century, may have been named after Prince Ivan Kubensky, a prominent local land-owner who died in 1546. It grew in importance in the second half of the 19th century when the Moscow-Smolensk railway passed through the area. The construction of the Moscow-Smolensk Railway in 1870 transformed the village into a transport hub. The railway allowed for the rapid movement of goods and people, leading to the growth of local industry and the establishment of the town as a "dacha" (summer home) destination for Moscow's elite.

The military test-range for tanks opened in 1931 and the military airbase opened soon afterwards. In December 1941 the Red Army halted the Wehrmacht's drive towards Moscow on the outskirts of Kubinka.

Kubinka gained town status in 2004.

== Administrative and municipal status ==
Within the framework of administrative divisions, Kubinka, together with twenty-three rural localities, is incorporated into Odintsovsky District as the Town of Kubinka. As a municipal formation, the Town of Kubinka is organized as the Kubinka Urban Settlement within Odintsovsky Municipal District.

== Transportation ==
=== Railway transport ===
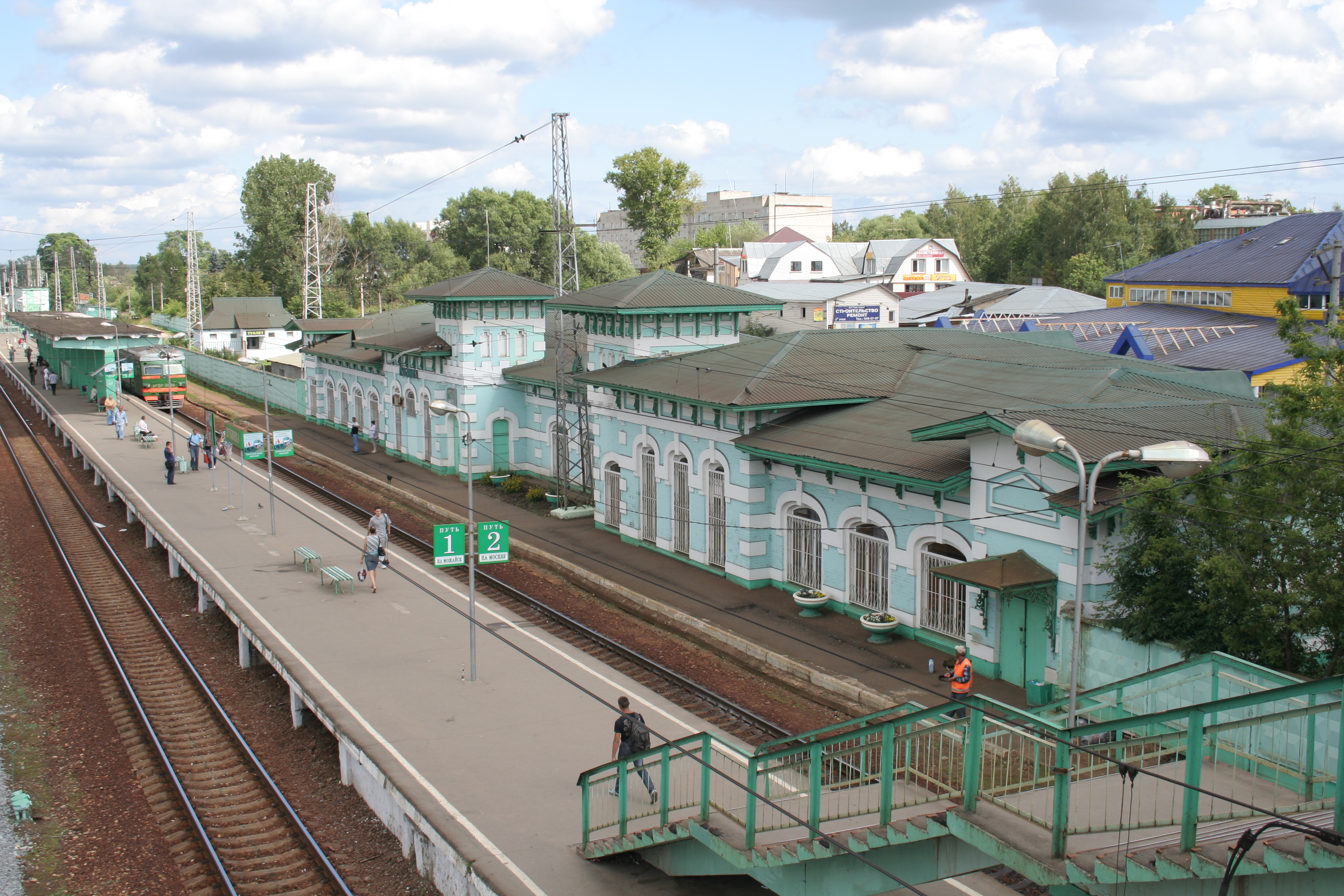
Kubinka railway station

A suburban line links the town to Moscow's Belorussky railway station (the station Kubinka I). The train ride takes approximately 75 minutes. In 2015 a new 10 km train line opened in Kubinka. It goes from Kubinka railway station to Patriot Park, through the station "Museum", located near Kubinka Tank Museum. The railway station Kubinka II of the Greater Ring of the Moscow Railway is also in Kubinka.

== Military ==
Kubinka was the location of the Soviet Union's tank proving grounds, and today is the home of the Kubinka Tank Museum. It is also the location of the MAPO aircraft Maintenance Factory #121 and the Kubinka air base. This base serves as a base for the 237th Centre for Display of Aviation Equipment, which consists of Swifts and Russian Knights, who took place in the aerobatic show during 2010 Moscow Victory Day Parade.

== Culture ==
Patriot Park was completed in 2017; a preliminary opening of the so-called "military Disneyland" took place in June 2015 by Vladimir Putin. It is located south of the Minsk highway at the border with the neighbouring settlements Golitsyno and Kalininets in the east and complements the local tourist attractions Kubinka Aviation Museum and Kubinka Tank Museum. The tank museum is located near the city. One of its most notable exhibits is Panzerkampfwagen VIII Maus which is the only remaining example in the world. This museum is also home to some unique and experimental armoured vehicles.

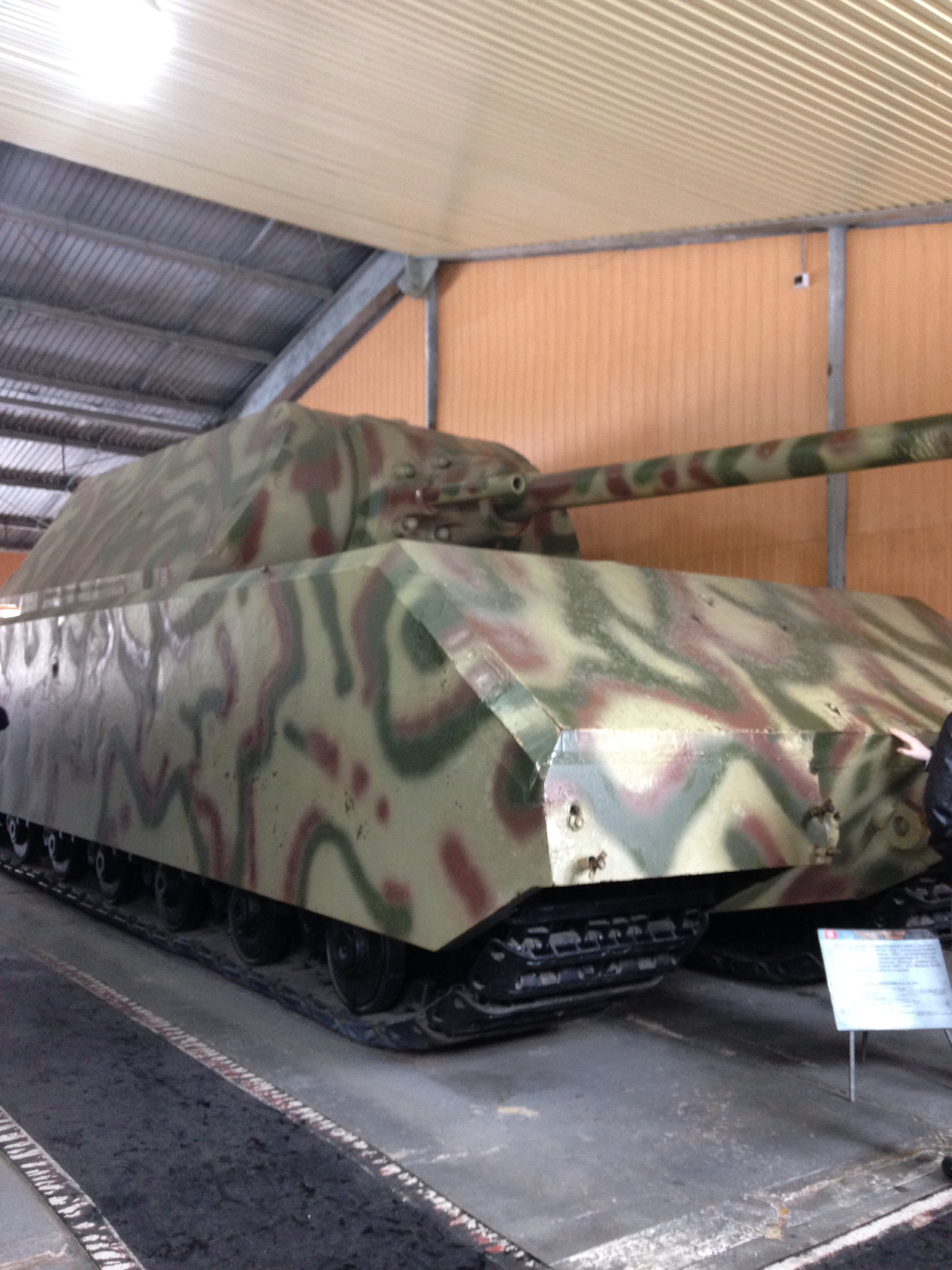
Panzer VIII Maus in Kubinka

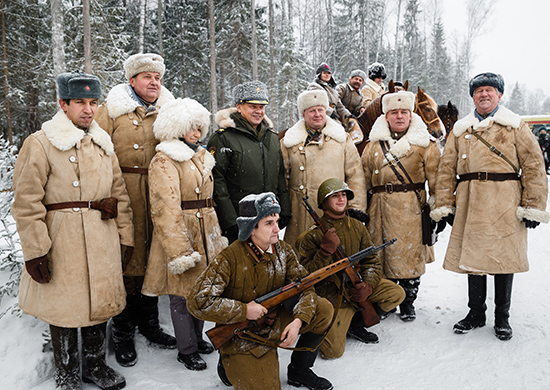
Russian Minister of Defence Sergey Shoygu at the opening of the memorial complex "Partizan Village" in the area of Patriot Park

== Healthcare ==
Kubinka's main hospital is District hospital N°3.
