= Mikoyan MiG SVB =

1990s cancelled Russian airliner project

SVB

General information
- Type: airliner and cargo aircraft
- National origin: Russia
- Manufacturer: MiG
- Designer: Aleksandr A. Yefimov; Yuri V. Andreyev
- Status: Cancelled project

The Mikoyan MiG SVB (Cyrillic: Микоян МиГ СВБ) was a 1990s Russian project to develop a turboprop-powered regional airliner and cargo transport for hot and high environments, including operations at night and in all weather. The SVB was expected to have considerably lower operating costs than similar aircraft already in service, such as the Antonov An-32, largely due to the type's newer and lower-power Klimov TV7-117S engines.

"SVB" stood for Samolet Vysotnogo Bazirovaniya (Самолет Высотного Базирования) — "Aircraft for high-altitude bases" in Russian, and the project was known internally at MiG as article 801 (изделие 801, izdeliye 801). Political and economic instability around the dissolution of the Soviet Union ended the project in 1994.

== Design ==
The SVB design was conventional for aircraft of its type: a shoulder-wing cantilever monoplane with a conventional tail. It was to have retractable tricycle undercarriage, with the main units retracting into fairings on the sides of the fuselage, in addition to flotation devices. Power was to be provided by two turboprop engines mounted on the wings, driving tractor propellers. The wings were to be equipped with high-lift devices. One unusual feature of the design was that the fuselage maintained a constant, rectangular cross-section from aft of the flight deck all the way to the rear of the aircraft.

Two basic passenger configurations were proposed for the regional airliner: a standard 40-seat version with eight rows of five seats, and a 50-seat high-density version with ten rows of five seats at a decreased pitch. In both cases, a single aisle was to be provided, offset to starboard.

In cargo configuration, the SVB was to be equipped with a loading ramp in its rear fuselage and have an electric hoist fitted on tracks on the cabin ceiling. The interior was to be fully pressurised.

== Development ==
The SVB was one of MiG's konversiya ("conversion") projects. As the Cold War eased during the late 1980s, Soviet defence manufacturers were compelled to reallocate some of their production to civilian projects. This particular project originated with Fatidin R. Mukhamedov, who was head of MiG's Dushanbe office and therefore familiar with the challenges of air transport in Tajikistan where airstrips were short, located at altitudes of up to 4,000 metres (13,000 ft), and where ambient temperatures could reach 40 °C (100 °F). The project set out to provide capacity to deliver 5 tonnes (11,000 lb) of cargo over 1,500 kilometres (930 mi; 810 nmi) under such conditions. Work on the design was carried out from 1990 to 1994.

== Specifications (as designed) ==
Data from Taylor, Lambert & Munson 1993, p.288

General characteristics

- Crew: Two pilots, plus two flight attendants (airliner version) or cargo handlers (cargo version)
- Capacity: 50 passengers (airliner version) or 5 tonnes (11,000 lb) of cargo
- Length: 22.22 m (72 ft 11 in)
- Wingspan: 25.90 m (85 ft 0 in)
- Height: 8.07 m (26 ft 6 in)
- Wing area: 62 m^{2} (670 sq ft)
- Max takeoff weight: 19,400 kg (42,770 lb)
- Powerplant: 2 × Klimov TV7-117S turboprops, 1,839 kW (2,466 shp) each

Performance

- Cruise speed: 550 km/h (340 mph, 300 kn) normal cruising at 6,000 metres (20,000 ft)
- Range: 1,500 km (930 mi, 810 nmi) with 5 tonnes (11,000 lb) payload, plus reserves
