= Kubinka (air base) =

Airport in Russia

Kubinka
- Кубинка
- Kubinka, Moscow Oblast in Russia
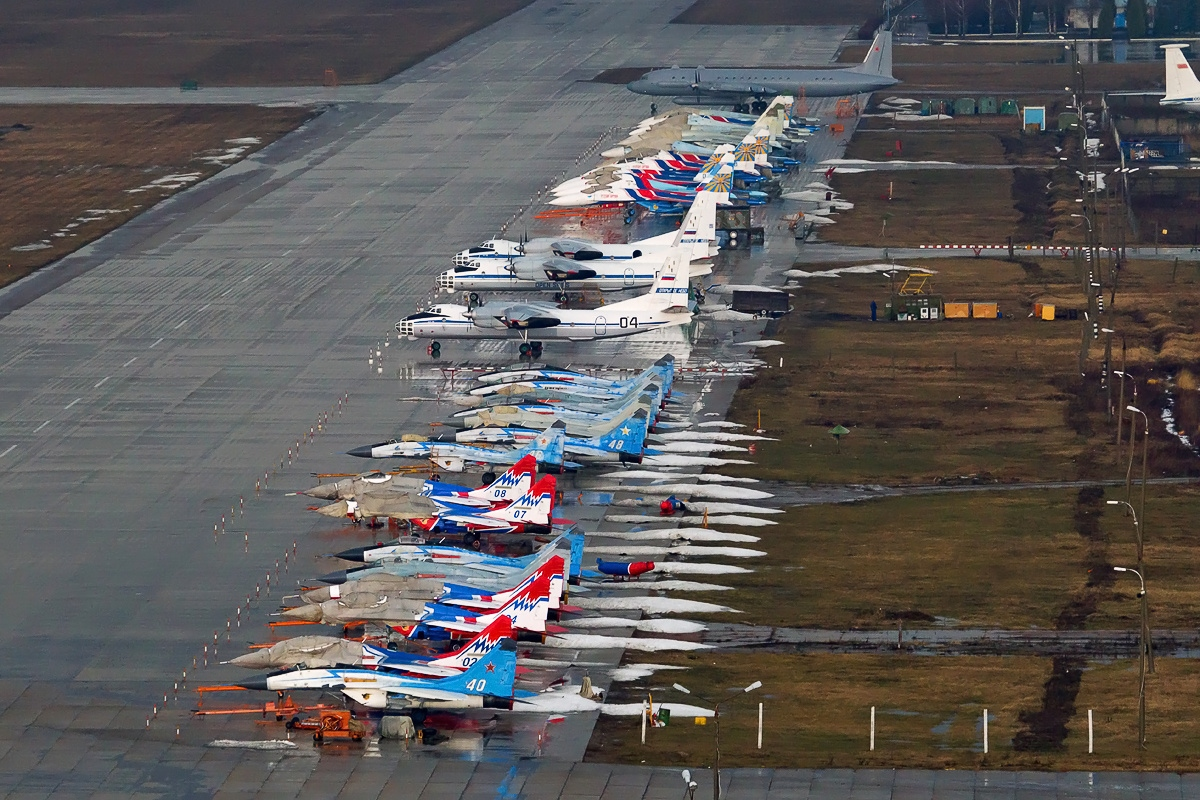
- Kubinka air base

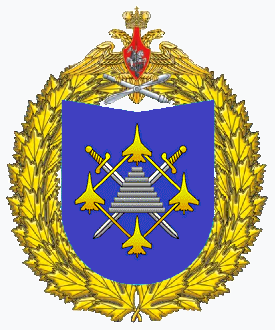

Site information
- Type: Air Base
- Owner: Ministry of Defence
- Operator: Russian Aerospace Forces

Location
- Shown within Moscow Oblast Kubinka (Russia)
- Coordinates: 55°36′42″N 36°39′0″E

Site history
- Built: 1935
- In use: 1935–present

Airfield information
- Identifiers: ICAO: UUMB
- Elevation: 187 metres (614 ft) AMSL
Runways
| Direction | Length and surface |
|---|---|
| 04/22 | 2,500 metres (8,202 ft) Concrete |

Kubinka (Russian: Кубинка) is an air base in Moscow Oblast, Russia, located 5 km (3.1 mi) northwest of Kubinka. In close proximity to Moscow, the Kubinka facility is generally home to the best squadrons of the Russian Aerospace Forces.

The 82nd aviation detachment (separate) arrived at the base in 1935, joined in 1938 by the 11th and 24th Aviation Regiments. Personnel of these units field-tested the advanced Yak-1 and LaGG-3 fighters and defended Moscow during the Second World War. After the war, the base became home to the 324th Svirskaya Fighter Aviation Division from November 1945. In November 1950, the whole 324th Fighter Aviation Division was redeployed to Korea, and the base was taken over by the 9th Fighter Aviation Division from February 1951.

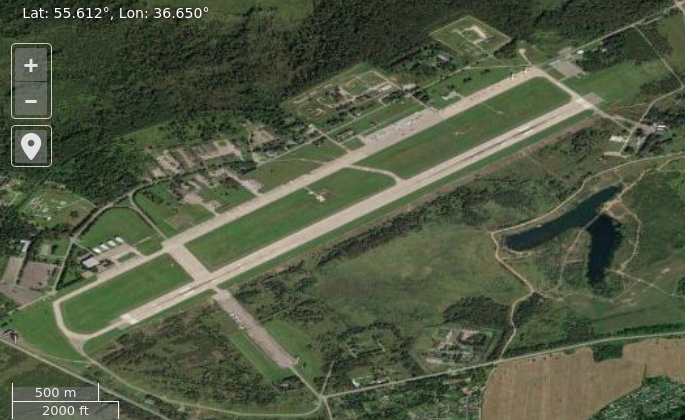
Satellite image of Kubinka air base

Units which have been stationed at Kubinka include:

- 237th Centre for Display of Aviation Equipment (237 TsPAT) flying MiG-29E, Su-17C, Su-24, Su-25, and Su-27 during the 1990s (with one exception given as 239 TsPAT in Yefim Gordon's Su-24 book.) The regiment, which has inherited the traditions of the 19 OIAP (1938–1944) and the 176 Gv IAP (1944–1950), was formed under the number 234 in November 1950. It arrived at Kubinka at the beginning of 1952. On 15 January 1989 it was renamed the 237th Composite Aviation Regiment (Demonstration) (237 SAP(P)). It became the 237 TsPAT on 13 February 1992 and then gained the title "named for Air Marshal I.N. Kozhedub" on 10 August 1993.
- 234th Guards Instructional Interceptor Aviation Regiment (234 Gv IIAP) flying MiG-23MLD and MiG-29 aircraft.
- 378th Independent Composite Aviation Squadron (378 OSAE) flying Mil Mi-8 helicopters.
- 29 Gv IAP (during the 1940s and 1950s).
- 9th Fighter Aviation Division (November 1952 – 1993)

Most units at Kubinka were subordinated up until 2009–2010 to the Special Purpose Command of the Russian Air Force.

The 32nd Guards Fighter Aviation Regiment was based at Kubinka from February 1950 to 1962–63. The regiment was subordinated to the 9th Fighter Aviation Division. It was then reformed at the base after being deployed to Cuba as part of Operation Anadyr. The regiment initially flew MiG-19s but by 1962 was flying MiG-21F-13s. The regiment was still in place in the late 1980s. From 1968 to 1989 it was part of the 9th Fighter Aviation Division, stationed at Shatalovo (air base), Smolensk Oblast. The 32nd Guards Fighter Aviation Regiment was formed in 1941 as the 434th Fighter Aviation Regiment. It became 32nd Guards Fighter Aviation Regiment by an order of the People's Commissariat for Defence (Soviet Defence Ministry, NKO) in November 1942. The regiment was disbanded on 1 July 1989.

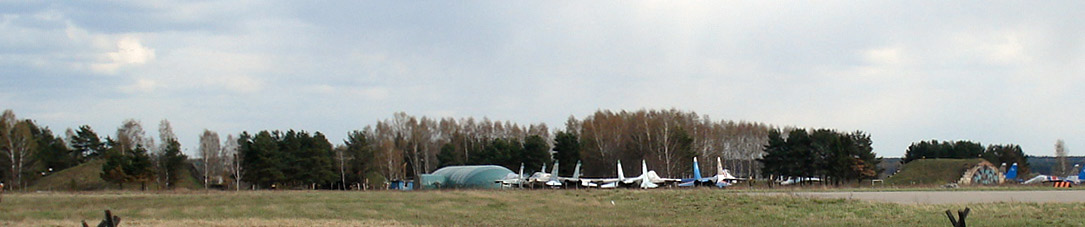
Kubinka Airforce base, the airfield and aircraft, archives photo 2007

Kubinka airfield is also used as an aeroclub for training civilian pilots. Aircraft have taken part in demonstration performances at festivals and special events in Patriot Park. Some training aircraft from Kubinka airbase were used to simulate air combat from the Second World War during the WW2 reenactment at the tank museum. The Kubinka airbase itself was also used as a venue for a large reenactment with aircraft and armored vehicles from the tank museum.

== Accidents and incidents ==
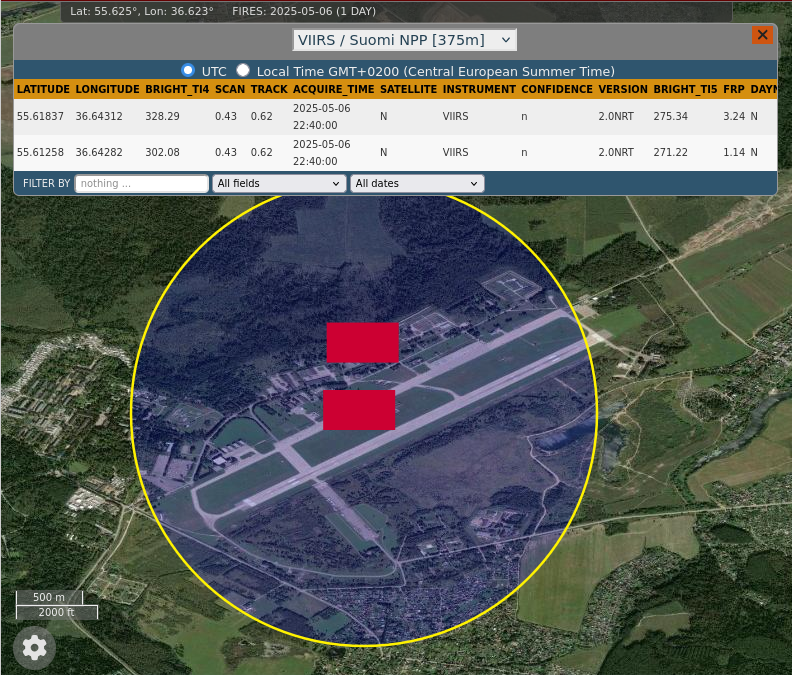
NASA's FIRMS detected fires at Kubinka air base on 6 May 2025 22:40:00 (UTC)

On 13 July 1994, a Russian Air Force An-26 was stolen from Kubinka AFB by an engineer planning to commit suicide. He circled Lyakhovo at 300–2000 feet until the aircraft ran out of fuel and crashed, killing him.

On 17 August 2021, the only flying prototype Il-112V (RF-41400) suffered a fire in the right engine and crashed near Kubinka Airfield. All three crew on board were killed, including test-pilot Nikolai Kuimov, Hero of the Russian Federation.

On 7 May 2025 a Ukrainian drone attack caused fires at the air base.

== See also ==
- List of military airbases in Russia
