= Tairov Ta-3 =

Soviet heavy fighter prototype

Ta-3

General information
- Type: Heavy fighter; Escort fighter
- National origin: Soviet Union
- Manufacturer: OKO (Kiev)
- Designer: Vsevolod Konstantinovich Tairov (ru)
- Number built: 4

History
- First flight: 31 December 1939 (OKO-6)

The Tairov Ta-3 was a twin-engined single-seat heavy fighter designed and produced in the Ukrainian SSR in the Soviet Union from 1939. The Ta-3 was envisioned to serve primarily as an escort fighter. Competing contemporaneous designs in the USSR included the Grushin Gr-1, Mikoyan-Gurevich DIS and Polikarpov TIS.

== Development ==
Tairov designed and built the OKO-6 to a Soviet Air Force requirement for a twin-engined escort fighter to escort and protect bombers on long range missions. Competing proposals included the Grushin Gr-1, MiG DIS and Polikarpov TIS.

The aircraft was a single-seat monoplane of mixed construction; with wing spars of 30KhGSA (30ХГСА) steel, D1 aluminium alloy ribs, flush riveted skin, and elektron magnesium alloy leading edges; the fuselage was largely of flush-riveted D1 aluminium alloy built as a semi-monocoque shell with a wooden tail section. Armour was provided fore and aft of the compact cockpit, and the heavy armament was grouped around the nose of the aircraft, with two 12.7mm BS machine guns in the upper nose and four ShVAK cannons in the lower forward fuselage. The engines were housed in large under-wing nacelles and drove counter-rotating propellers to eliminate torque effect with throttle movement.

First flown by Yu. K. Stankevich on 31 December 1939, the first aircraft was also tested by LII until the summer of 1940 when one of the engines threw a connecting-rod. The directional stability was found to be unsatisfactory so the second prototype (OKO-6bis) was built with a much longer rear fuselage, twin fins on the tips of a longer span tailplane as well as more powerful engines with LH rotation. The third prototype was initially called OKO-6bis, changed to Ta-3, was flown by Stankevich in May 1941 with M-89 engines, one AM-37 37 mm cannon and two ShVAK 20 mm cannons. The fourth airframe which was to be the Ta-3bis with M-82 engines was abandoned due to the German invasion, and further work on the Ta-3 was halted when Tairov was killed in an airline crash, traveling between Moscow and Kuybyshev, in December 1941.

== Variants ==
- OKO-6 – initial prototype with 950 / 1,000 hp (710 / 750 kW) M-88 engines, short fuselage and single fin and rudder. Armament:-2 × 12.7mm BS machine-guns and 4 × 20 mm ShVAK cannon in the forward fuselage.
- OKO-6bis – second prototype with lengthened fuselage, twin fins and M-88R engines. Armament:- 2 × 7.62mm ShKAS machine-guns and 4 × 20mm ShVAK cannon in the forward fuselage.
- Ta-3 – third prototype renamed from OKO-6bis, with M-89 engines and increased span wings. Armament:- 1 × 37 mm AM-37 cannon and 2 × 20 mm ShVAK cannon in the forward fuselage.
- Ta-3bis – uncompleted fourth prototype, with 1,250 hp (930 kW) Shvetsov M-82 engines, abandoned with the German invasion of USSR. Armament:- 1 × 37 mm AM-37 cannon and 2 × 20 mm ShVAK cannon in the forward fuselage.

== Specifications (Ta-3) ==
Data from Gunston, Bill. "Encyclopaedia of Russian Aircraft 1875–1995". London:Osprey. 1995. ISBN 1-85532-405-9

General characteristics

- Crew: one
- Length: 9.827 m (32 ft 2.87 in)
- Wingspan: 12.658 m (41 ft 6.37 in)
- Wing area: 26.9 m^{2} (290 sq ft)
- Empty weight: 4,500 kg (9,920 lb)
- Gross weight: 6,626 kg (14,607.8 lb)
- Powerplant: 2 × Tumansky M-88R 14-cylinder radial engine , 745.7 kW (1,000 hp) each

Performance

- Maximum speed: 595 km/h (369.7 mph, 321.3 kn)
- Range: 1,060 km (660 mi, 570 nmi)
- Service ceiling: 11,000 m (36,089 ft)
- Rate of climb: 5.55 m/s (1,093.6 ft/min)

Armament

- 1 × 37 mm AM-37 cannon
- 2 × 20 mm ShVAK cannon

== See also ==
Aircraft of comparable role, configuration, and era

- Focke-Wulf Fw 187
- Fokker D.XXIII
- Gloster F.9/37
- Grumman F5F Skyrocket
- Grushin Gr-1
- IMAM Ro.57
- Kawasaki Ki-45 II
- Lockheed P-38 Lightning
- Westland Whirlwind
