= Polikarpov TIS =

Soviet heavy fighter prototype

- The second prototype (MA) of the TIS

General information
- Type: Heavy fighter
- National origin: Soviet Union
- Manufacturer: Polikarpov OKB
- Designer: Mikhail Yangel
- Status: canceled
- Number built: 2

History
- First flight: September 1941

The Polikarpov TIS was a heavily armed Soviet heavy fighter designed during the early 1940s. Competing contemporaneous designs in the USSR included the Grushin Gr-1, Mikoyan-Gurevich DIS and Tairov Ta-3.

Only two prototypes were built because its intended engines proved to be too unreliable to be placed into production and the engines' manufacturer lacked the resources to fix the problems.

The second prototype crashed in September 1944 and the program was canceled after the death of Nikolai Nikolaevich Polikarpov, the chief designer of his eponymous OKB, earlier that year.

== Design and development ==
The original request for proposals for a heavy escort fighter (Tyazholyy Istrebitel' Soprovozhdeniya) was received at the Polikarpov OKB in November 1938, but the press of work with the I-180 and SPB prototypes prevented any significant design work until the third quarter of 1940. Mikhail Yangel was appointed head designer, but his job was complicated by multiple changes in the role of the aircraft from escort fighter to interceptor, dive bomber, and eventually reconnaissance.

The prototype, internally designated as aircraft or TIS "A", was a low-wing, all-metal, cantilever monoplane with two Mikulin AM-37 engines and a twin tail. The monocoque fuselage had four 7.62 mm (0.300 in) ShKAS machine guns in the nose, each with 1,000 rounds. The pilot and the gunner/radio-operator were seated back-to-back, separated by an armor plate, under sliding canopies. The gunner had a dorsal ShKAS on a TSS-1 mount with 750 rounds that could be used once his canopy was slid forward. He also had a ventral ShKAS mounted below the armored floor that he could access by raising a hatch in the floor and kneeling down to fire the machine guns. The ventral gun was provided with 500 rounds of ammunition. A 12.7 mm (0.50 in) UBK machine gun with 400 rounds and a 20 mm (0.79 in) ShVAK cannon with 350 rounds were mounted in each wing root. Underneath the wings were two racks each capable of carrying a single 500 kg (1,100 lb) FAB-500 bomb. The wing had automatic leading edge slats and four split flaps separated by the engine nacelles. The single wheel landing gear retracted into the rear part of the nacelles, as did the tailwheel into the fuselage.

The 'A' prototype first flew in September 1941 and reached a speed of 555 km/h (345 mph) at 5,800 m (19,000 ft) altitude. It suffered from a lack of directional stability and the engines were unreliable and vibrated above 5,000 m (16,000 ft). Factory No. 51 attempted to fix the stability problem in late September by increasing the area of the rear fins, but was unsuccessful. Flight testing continued in October in Novosibirsk, to where the LII (Russian: Лётно-исследовательский институт—Flight Research Institute) had been evacuated. Eliminating the stability problem took until March 1942, although the engines remained as unreliable as ever.

By the summer of 1942 it was clear that the Mikulin OKB lacked the resources to fix the problems with the AM-37 and that the TIS would need a new engine, but the OKB's resources were fully utilized on the I-185 and ITP programs and the TIS program was put on hold. Work did not resume on the TIS until the second half of 1943, after the I-185 had been canceled, and the Mikulin AM-39 engine was selected. A new prototype was built, internally called the "MA", with a completely revised armament. Two ShVAK cannon replaced the nose ShKAS machine guns and a UBT machine gun in a VUB-1 mount replaced the dorsal ShKAS, while the ventral machine gun was removed entirely. Two 37 mm (1.5 in) Shpitalny Sh-37 or 45 mm (1.8 in) 111P cannon replaced the wing root guns. The intended AM-39s were unavailable and therefore two Mikulin AM-38Fs were used as a temporary expedient. The engine radiators were moved from the nacelles into the wings. They were fed by inlets in the leading edge and outlets on the undersurface of the wing.

== Operational history ==
The "MA" was flight tested from June to September 1944 and generally met its expected performance figures. The engines were optimized for low altitudes and the aircraft could only reach a maximum speed of 535 km/h (332 mph) and a ceiling of 6,600 metres (21,700 ft). It did, however, have an initial climb rate of 13.5 m/s (44 ft/s) and, on the basis of the flight tests, it was concluded that it would be capable reaching 650 km/h (400 mph) at 7,150 m (23,460 ft) and would take 6.4 minutes to reach 5,000 metres (16,404 ft) once the AM-39s were fitted. A brake failure on 29 June damaged the "MA", which required a month to repair, but a crash-landing on 16 September caused by the failure of the undercarriage to extend proved to be the death knell for the TIS program. The OKB was being shut down after Polikarpov's death at the end of June and there was no one willing to champion the TIS.

== Specifications (TIS (A)) ==
Data from Gunston, The Osprey Encyclopedia of Russian Aircraft 1875-1995

General characteristics

- Crew: 2
- Length: 11.7 m (38 ft 5 in)
- Wingspan: 15.5 m (50 ft 10 in)
- Height: 4.35 m (14 ft 3 in)
- Wing area: 34.8 m^{2} (375 sq ft)
- Airfoil: NACA-230
- Empty weight: 5,800 kg (12,787 lb)
- Gross weight: 7,840 kg (17,284 lb)
- Fuel capacity: 2,430 L (530 imp gal; 640 US gal)
- Powerplant: 2 × Mikulin AM-37 liquid-cooled V12 engines, 1,044 kW (1,400 hp) each
- Propellers: 3-bladed VISh-61SF

Performance

- Maximum speed: 555 km/h (345 mph, 300 kn)
- Range: 1,720 km (1,070 mi, 930 nmi)
- Service ceiling: 10,250 m (33,630 ft)
- Time to altitude: 7.3 minutes to 5,000 m (16,404 ft)

Armament

- Guns:
  - 2 × 20 mm ShVAK cannon (wing roots)
  - 2 × 12.7 mm UBK machine guns (wing roots)
  - 4 × 7.62 mm ShKAS machine guns (nose)
  - 2 × 7.62 mm ShKAS machine guns (flexibly mounted)
- Bombs: up to 1,000 kg (2,200 lb)

== See also ==
Aircraft of comparable role, configuration, and era

- Bristol Beaufighter
- de Havilland Mosquito
- Grumman XP-50
- Kawasaki Ki-45
- Lockheed P-38 Lightning
- Messerschmitt Me 210
- Mikoyan-Gurevich DIS
- Petlyakov Pe-3
- Westland Whirlwind
