= Linkowo =

- Village
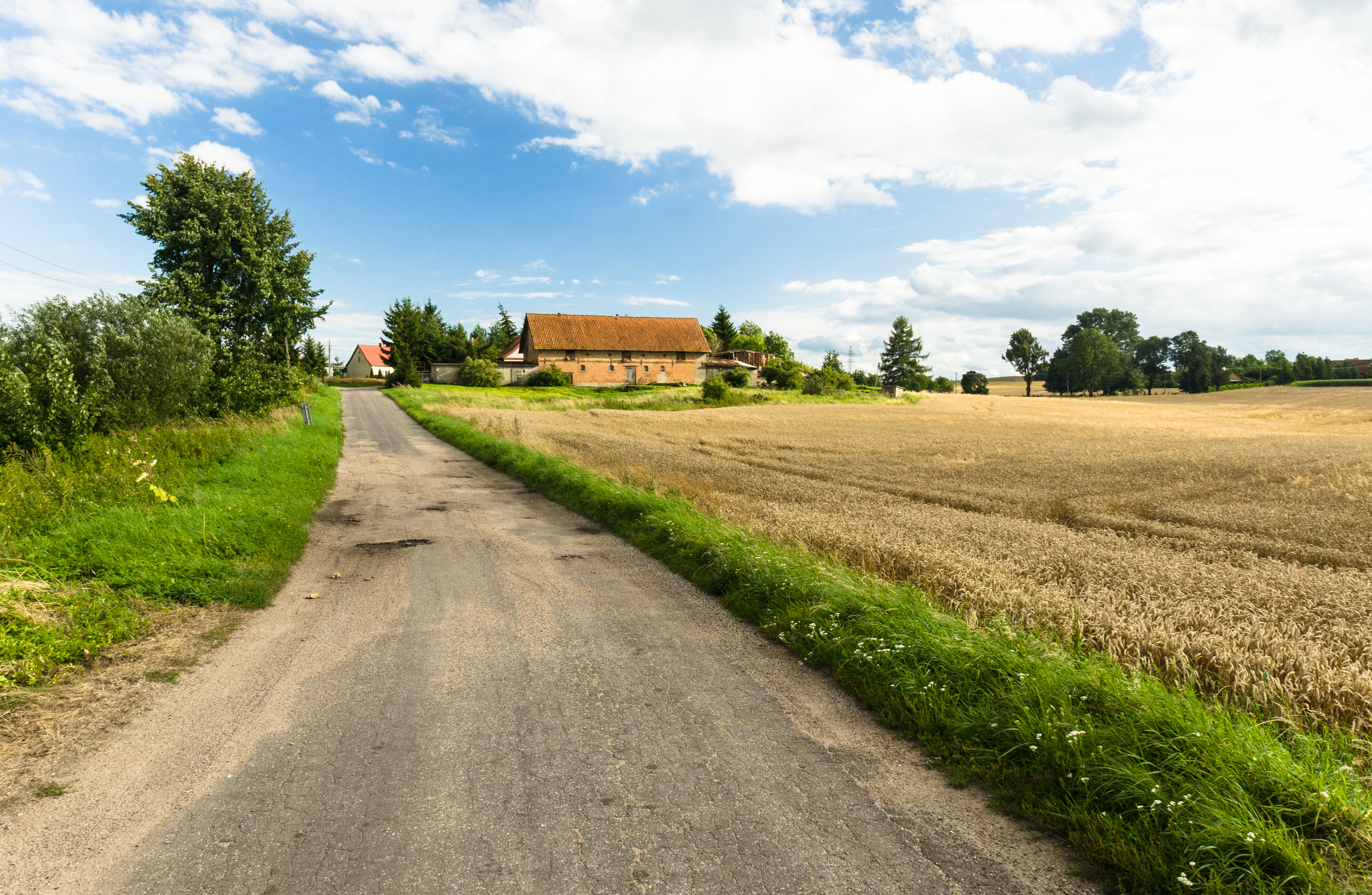

- Location within Poland
- Coordinates: 54°5′51″N 21°15′51″E
- Country: Poland
- Voivodeship: Warmian-Masurian
- County: Kętrzyn
- Gmina: Kętrzyn
- Population: 133

Linkowo [linˈkɔvɔ] is a village in the administrative district of Gmina Kętrzyn, within Kętrzyn County, Warmian-Masurian Voivodeship, in northern Poland.

== Notable residents ==
- Karl von der Gröben (1788–1876), German general
