= Battle of Nuits Saint Georges =

- Part of Franco-Prussian War
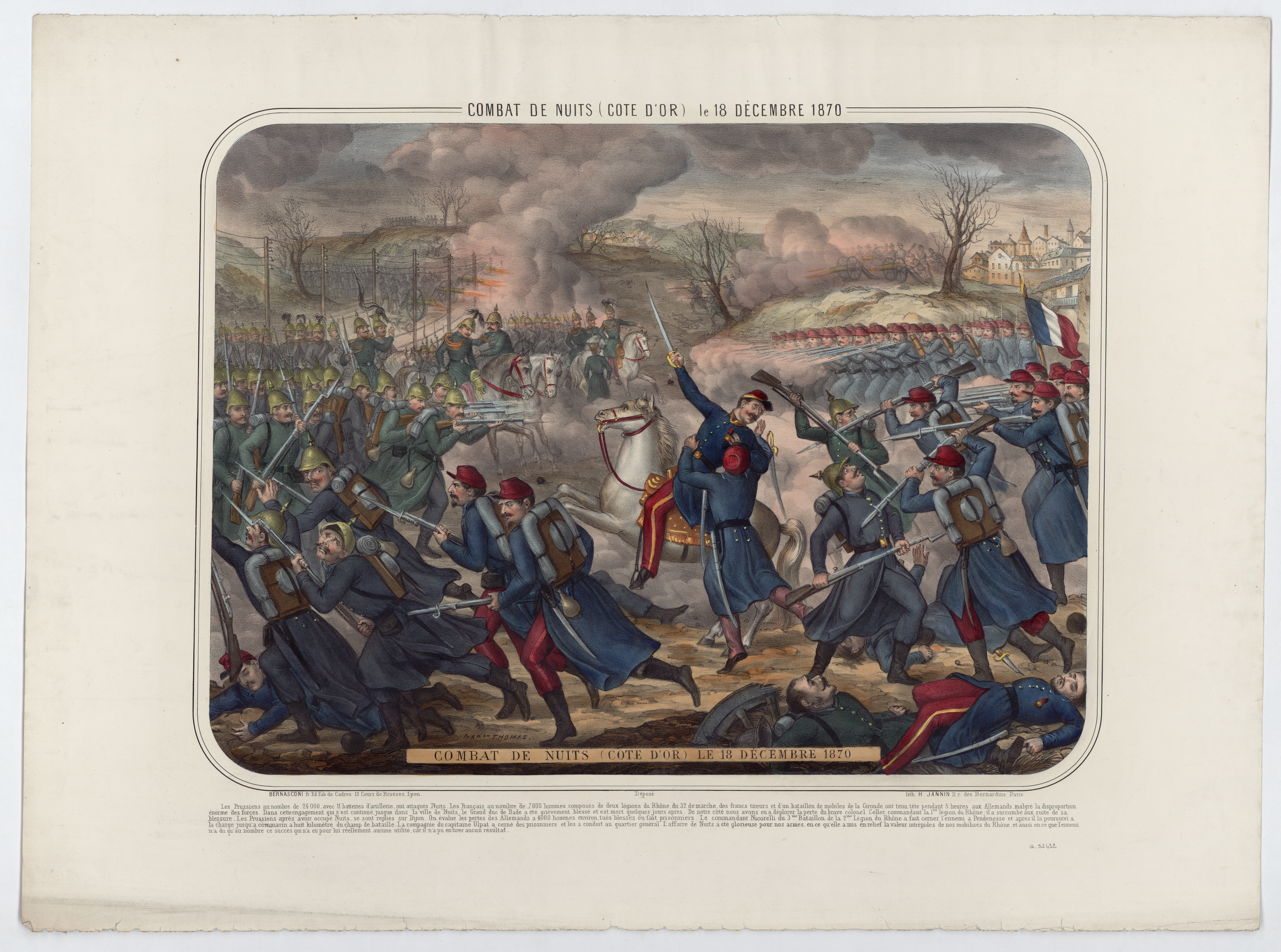
Date	December 18, 1870
Location	Nuits-Saint-Georges, Côte-d'Or, France
Result	German victory

Belligerents
French Republic	North German Confederation: Prussia; Baden

Commanders and leaders
Camille Crémer	August von Werder; Adolf von Glümer (WIA)

Strength
10,000–19,000 troops	2 Brigades

Casualties and losses
Many officers and 1,000+ soldiers killed, 700 people captured, many rifle and ammunition stores, 4 artillery trucks, 3 ammunition carts along with many weapons and costumes were seized	54 officers and 880 soldiers were killed and wounded

The Battle of Nuits-Saint-Georges was a battle in the Franco-Prussian War, which took place on December 18, 1870. In this battle, the Baden Division of Germany commanded by General Adolf von Glümer and the XIV Legion under the command of General August von Werder, took Nuits from a French force led by General Camille Crémer, forced the French army to withdraw overnight with heavy losses for both sides. Glümer himself was also slightly wounded in this engagement, while the French lost much of their equipment to the German army. Crémer is credited with fighting with great courage in this battle, but the quality of his overall leadership has been questioned.

== The Battle ==
During the invasion of Eastern France, General Werder sent General Adolf von Glümer and the Baden Division to Beaune, to conduct an armed reconnaissance south of Dijon. At the same time, French forces led by Camille Crémer were also en route from Dijon to Beaune in the north. Glümer moved with his two Baden brigades to the town of Nuits and discovered a substantial enemy force was stationed there, and the German and French armies clashed together in the vineyards around Nuits St. Georges. At Boncourt-le-Bois, to the east of Nuits, the German advance met strong French resistance, but by noon the Germans had taken control of the area. With the support of artillery batteries in the hills west of Nuits, the French army made a fierce defense of the railway section through the mountains and near Meuzin. When Baden's main force arrived at 2 p.m., Glümer launched a general offensive. The German infantry forces swept through a wide open plain, and the French which had established positions and fired a short-range assault which caused heavy losses for the Germans, especially in the ranks of officers. A close skirmish broke out between the two factions, and the fierce battle ended with the German army capturing the town of Nuits and the garrison, driving the French from their strong positions in the town. Both sides were exhausted from the battle.

== Aftermath ==
The French army, in addition to more than 1,000 casualties, also lost thousands more prisoners and deserted. While the French retreated to Chalon-sur-Saône, the Baden army remained in Nuits and the villages to the east that night. Neither side wanted to fight another battle in the following days. However, Nuits was in a disadvantageous position and the Germans' plans did not require them to hold Nuits, so on 19 December, the Germans withdrew after making sure the French forces were far away enough. In Lyon, news of Cremer's defeat sparked riots.
