= Emil Meinecke =

WW1 German fighter ace

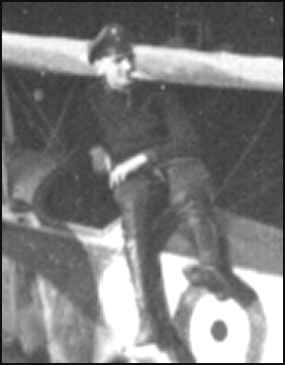
- Meinecke with a downed Bristol Scout, taken on February 17, 1917
- Born: 20 July 1892; Mannheim, Grand Duchy of Baden, German Empire
- Died: 2 May 1975 (aged 82); St. Catharines, Ontario, Canada
- Military career
- Allegiance: Germany
- Branch: Aviation
- Rank: Leutnant
- Unit: Flieger-Abteilung 6
- Awards: Iron Cross First and Second Class, Military Karl-Friedrich Merit Order, Honor Goblet for Victory in Air Combat, Turkish Liakat Medal with Swords, Gallipoli Star, Pilot's Badge
- Other work: Longtime test pilot and mechanic for Fokker

Leutnant Emil Meinecke (20 July 1892 – 2 May 1975) was a German flying ace during World War I. He was credited with six confirmed aerial victories. After the war, he stayed in aviation, rising to the post of chief test pilot for Fokker. His post there ended with Germany's defeat in World War II. Meinecke then returned to his trade as an aircraft mechanic during the Berlin Airlift. He eventually became a Canadian citizen in 1950.

== Biography ==
Emil Meinecke was born in Mannheim in the Grand Duchy of Baden on 20 July 1892. He apprenticed as an aircraft mechanic as a teenager, qualifying in 1910. He then worked for German pioneer aviator Karl Jatho who taught him to fly. Meinecke finally soloed in 1913.

Emil Meinecke joined the German military aviation effort when World War I began in 1914. When he enlisted on 20 August 1914, he had not yet completed requirements for his International Flying Certificate, but carried a letter of recommendation for pilot training from Jatho. On 25 July 1915, Meinecke qualified for his Military Pilot's Certificate. He was then assigned to Johannisthal Air Field in Berlin as a flying instructor.

Meinecke was posted to duty training Turkish aviation cadets in the Ottoman Empire on 1 October 1915. Then, in April 1916, he was posted to Flieger-Abteilung 6 at San Stefan as a fighter pilot under Theodor Croneiss. He scored six confirmed victories in a year and two days, starting with downing a Royal Aircraft Factory B.E.2c with his Fokker Eindekker monoplane on 27 January 1917. Aerial opposition to the mixed German-Turkish unit came from the Greek Air Services and the Royal Naval Air Service.

== Honors and awards ==
By war's end, Emil Meinecke had won a number of military honors. He had received the Ehrenbecher für den Sieger im Luftkampfe, or Honor Goblet for Victory in Air Combat as well as both the First and Second Class Iron Cross.

On 24 September 1917, Meinecke's native Grand Duchy of Baden had awarded him the silver medal of the Military Karl-Friedrich Merit Order Medal, as well as a Medal for Bravery.

His awards from the Ottoman Empire included the Pilot's Badge, the Gallipoli Star, and the Silver Liakat Medal with Swords.

== List of aerial victories ==
See also Aerial victory standards of World War I

| No. | Date/time | Aircraft | Foe | Result | Location | Notes |
|---|---|---|---|---|---|---|
| 1 | 27 January 1917 | Fokker Eindekker | Royal Aircraft Factory B.E.2c | Destroyed | Vicinity of Yenishir | |
| 2 | 12 February 1917 | | Henry Farman F27 serial number N3021 | Destroyed | Vicinity of Çanakkale, Turkey | |
| 3 | 17 February 1917 | | Bristol Scout s/n 8996 | Captured | Vicinity of Hamidge | Victim: Lieutenant Gordon T. Bysshe |
| 4 | 20 January 1918 | | Sopwith Baby s/n N1445 | Destroyed; set afire | Off Nagara Point | Sopwith was attacking a German warship |
| 5 | 23 January 1918 | | Sopwith 1 1/2 Strutter | | Maidos | Victim: Greek Naval Lieutenant Spyros Hambras |
| | 24 January 1918 | | Sopwith | | Gulf of Saros, Turkey | |
| 6 | 29 January 1918 | | Sopwith Camel | Destroyed | Vicinity of Şile, Turkey | |

== Post World War I ==
Meinecke was discharged from military service in December 1919. He was unable to find work in Germany, so he moved to the Netherlands to work as a mechanic for Fokker. As part of his job, he accompanied airplanes being sold to the Russians, and test flew them for acceptance trials.

Meinecke also did considerable testing on the original Fokker S.I trainer before writing it off in an emergency landing in October 1921.

Circa 1925–1927, Meinecke was in Bolivia as Fokker's technical representative for the Chaco War buildup.

On 22 February 1929, he tested the Fokker F.XIV at Schiphol, the Netherlands. He followed this up by testing the first Fokker with retractable landing gear, the tri-motored Fokker F.XX, on 3 June 1933 . On 27 February 1936, Meinecke flew the maiden test flight of the Fokker DXXI from Welschap Airfield. In 1936, he flew a replica Fokker Spider for Queen Wilhelmina at Schiphol.

During World War II, Meinecke remained in the Netherlands, serving as a ferry pilot and test pilot for Fokker. In one incident, on 5 May 1941, he flew as the chase plane pilot in a sortie of two Fokker G.1s; the test plane, flown by Hidde Leegstra and Piet Vos, two Dutch pilots, eluded him as they defected to England.

The end of the war saw him once again working as a mechanic. In 1949, he mechanised for the 53rd Troop Carrier Squadron USAF during the Berlin Airlift. Meinecke emigrated to Canada in 1950, and became a Canadian citizen on 1 June 1956. He died in St. Catharines, Ontario, Canada.

== See also ==
- Photos of Emil Meinecke at http://www.aeroconservancy.com/meinecke.htm
- Photo of Meinecke perched atop the second airplane he shot down, at https://4.bp.blogspot.com/_4NsxaqK7h8E/S3MZ4CZaAOI/AAAAAAAAC4E/zcYhQ8L_lwo/s1600-h/meineckebristol.jpg
- Meinecke Memorabilia Retrieved 17 February 2012.
