= Battle of Chateauneuf =

- Part of Franco-Prussian War
Date	3 December 1870
Location	Châteauneuf, Côte-d'Or, France 47°13′13″N 4°38′34″E
Result	German Victory

Belligerents
French Republic	North German Confederation: Prussia; Baden

Commanders and leaders
Camille Crémer	General Keller

Strength
8,000 soldiers, 8–10 artillery pieces	Unknown

Casualties and losses
Unknown	153 casualties

The Battle of Châteauneuf was a battle in the Franco-Prussian War that took place on 3 December 1870 at the Châteauneuf, Côte-d'Or, France. During this engagement, the 3rd Infantry Brigade of the Prussian army, which was a part of the Baden Division and was under the command of General Keller repelled an ambush of the French army under the command of General Camille Crémer. The battle facilitated the Prussian army to continue its withdrawal from Autun. The battle lasted for seven hours, and brought the Prussian army negligible losses, with 153 casualties. However, the Germans viewed this engagement as one of their most glorious victories of the campaign.

== Background ==
During 26–27 November 1870, Giuseppe Garibaldi commanded the Army of the Vosges, which was a guerrilla force volunteer army of France that was then preventing the advances of the German army in Dijon. Although initially successful, Garibaldi's army was eventually crushed by the German Infantry under General August von Werder, and pushed back to Autun. After the victory of the German army at Dijon General Keller's brigade - consisting of troops from Baden - was ordered to launch an attack on Autun in order to probe the base of operations of the Army of the Vosges, their resources, as well as their connection to the French rulers. On 1 December 1870 Keller's army marched to Autun and defeated the enemy detachments. 23 French soldiers were taken prisoner by the Germans. The next day, 2 December 1870, while the Germans were preparing to launch an attack, Garibaldi prepared an escape retreat from his base. At that moment however, Werder urgently ordered the retreat of his corps to Dijon. New French forces had appeared in the Saône valley where a German detachment at Nuits St. Georges was "handled", which probably pressured Werder to issue the retreat order. With the retreat of the German Corps to Dijon, Garibaldi was able to breathe a sigh of relief.

== The Battle ==
General Crémer, having heard from Garibaldi and hastily dragging his division to Bligny sur Ouche, suddenly seized the slopes of the Chateauneuf, and sent his troops to les Bordes. His force consisted of 7 battalions, several detachments of the Freedom Corps, an Armstrong battery and several mountain guns. In total, he had 8,000 soldiers and 8-10 cannons. With an ambush position, they began their attack at 9 a.m. on 3 December from the Châteauneuf. The French opened fire fiercely on Keller's brigade and the entire brigade was in danger of being annihilated. However, General Keller's brigade quickly deployed. After a successful bombardment, German battalions fiercely attacked the slopes. Many of the men crawled uphill on their hands and knees. The first battalion of the German 5th Infantry Regiment is noted for its bravery in this engagement. Despite their favorable position, the French were held off. As a result, by 4 December Keller's Germans were safely back in Dijon.
