= Fokker G.I =

Dutch WWII heavy fighter

G.I
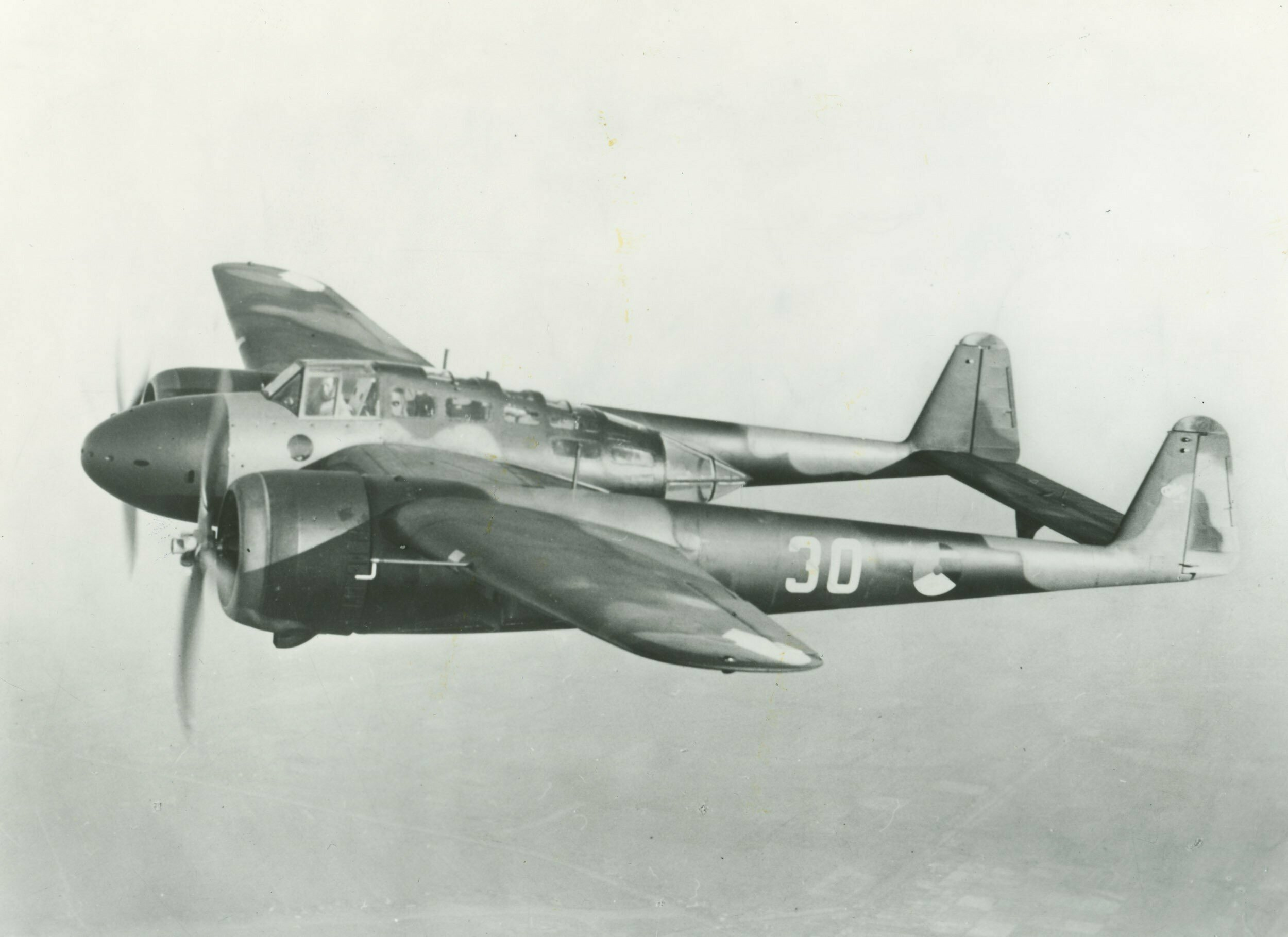

General information
- Type: Heavy fighter
- Manufacturer: Fokker
- Designer: Erich Schatzki and Marius Beeling (after 1938)
- Primary users: Luchtvaartafdeling (Note: The Royal Netherlands Air Force before World War II was known as the Luchtvaartafdeeling (correctly written in the 1930s style of writing with a double e.)) Luftwaffe
- Number built: 63

History
- First flight: 16 March 1937

The Fokker G.I was a Dutch twin-engined heavy fighter aircraft comparable in size and role to the German Messerschmitt Bf 110. Although in production prior to World War II, its combat introduction came at a time the Netherlands were overrun by the Germans. The few G.Is that were mustered into service were able to score several victories. Some of the aircraft were captured intact after the Germans had occupied the Netherlands. The remainder of the production run was taken over by the Luftwaffe for use as trainers.

== Design and development ==
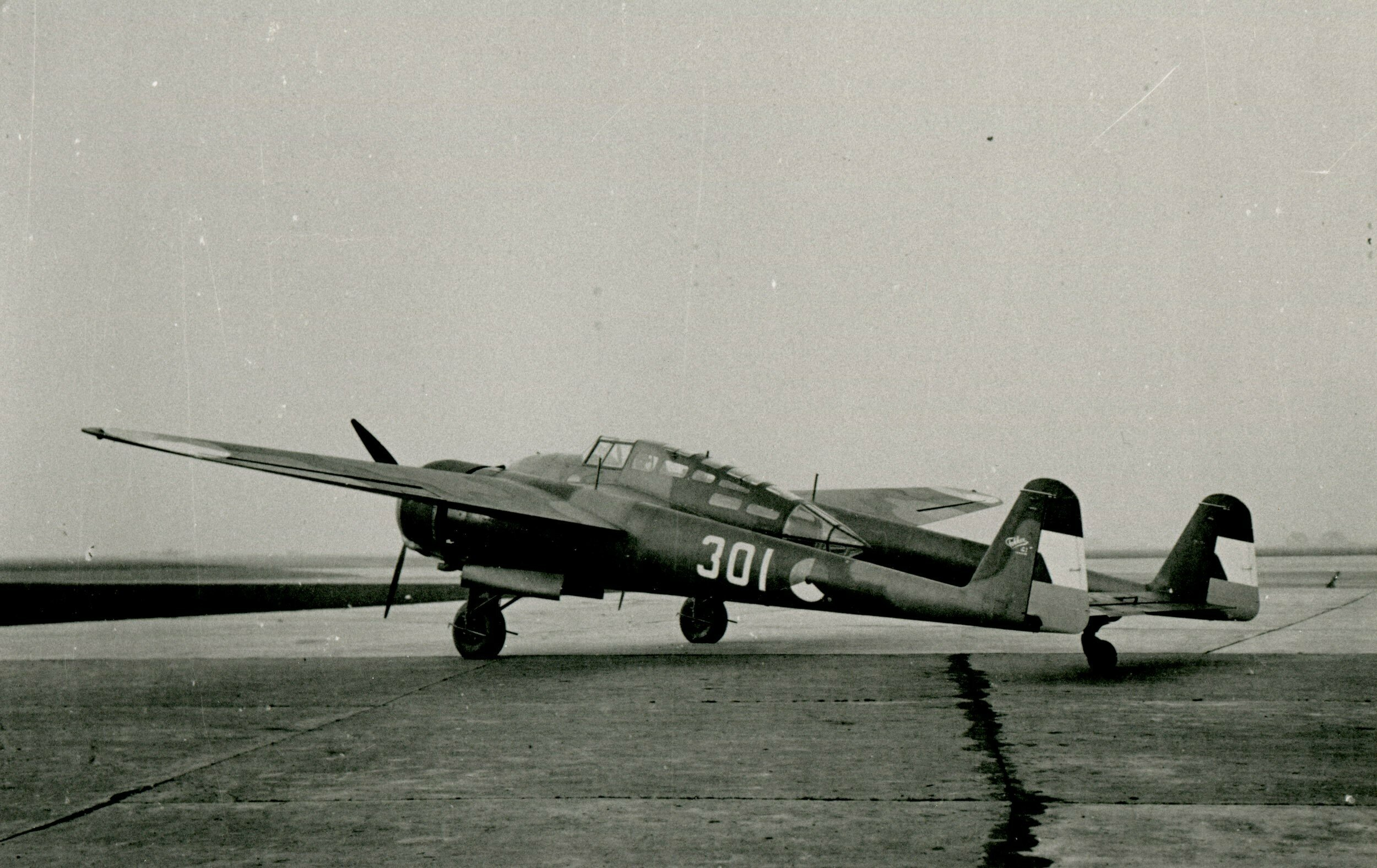
Dutch G.I; rear view

The G.I, given the nickname le Faucheur ("The Reaper" in French), was designed as a private venture in 1936 by Fokker chief engineer Dr. Schatzki. Intended for the role of jachtkruiser, "heavy" fighter or air cruiser, able to gain air superiority over the battlefield as well as being a bomber destroyer, the G.I would fulfil a role seen as important at the time, by advocates of Giulio Douhet's theories on air power. The Fokker G.I used a twin-engined, twin-boom layout that featured a central nacelle housing two or three crew members (a pilot, radio operator/navigator/rear gunner or a bombardier) as well as a formidable armament of twin 23 mm (.91 in) Madsen cannon and a pair of 7.9 mm (.31 in) machine guns (later eight machine guns) in the nose and one in a rear turret.

Besides its main mission, the G.I could perform ground attack and light bombing missions (it could carry a bomb load of one 400 kg/882 lb bomb or combinations of two 200 kg/441 lb or 10 26 kg/57 lb bombs). The design and construction of the prototype (registered as X-2) was completed in just seven months. At its introduction at the Paris Air Show in November 1936, even before its first flight, the G.I was a sensation, appearing in a purple and yellow finish (evocative of the Spanish Republican colors, thought to be Fokker's first export customer).

Demonstration on the Eindhoven airfield in 1937

Like all Fokker aircraft of the period, the G.I was of mixed construction. The front of the central pod were built around a welded frame, covered with aluminium plating; the back of the central pod and the wings were wood. The G.I prototype, powered by 485 kW (650 hp) Hispano-Suiza 14AB-02/03 engines, had its first flight at Welschap Airfield, near Eindhoven on 16 March 1937 with Karel Mares at the controls. Later, Emil Meinecke took over much of the test flights. The maiden flight went well but a test flight in September 1937 ended with a supercharger explosion that nearly caused the loss of the prototype. The accident prompted a replacement of the Hispano-Suiza engines with 559 kW (750 hp) Pratt & Whitney SB4-G Twin Wasp Junior engines.

== Operational history ==
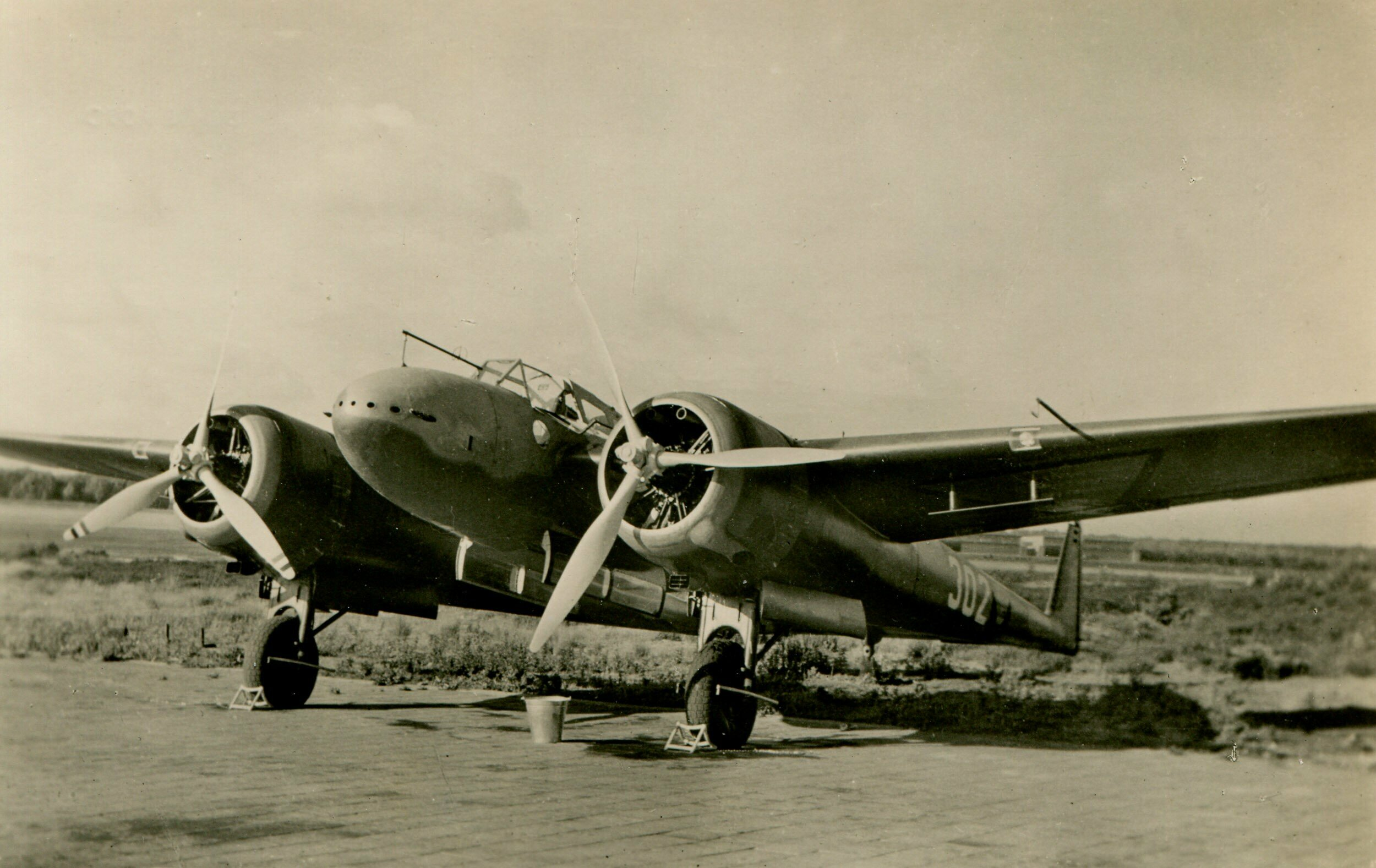

During testing, the company received a contract from the Spanish Republican government for 26 G.1 "export" versions with Pratt & Whitney engines. Despite receiving payment, the order was never fulfilled as the Dutch government embargoed the sale of military equipment to Spain. Fokker continued building the aircraft and a story was released to the press that they were intended for Finland. Finland was interested in the G.I but eventually bought Bristol Blenheim light bombers.

Besides the Dutch Royal Netherlands Air Force (Luchtvaartafdeeling Aviation Departement), several foreign air forces showed an interest in the G.I. as a fighter or dive-bomber. To test its potential as a dive-bomber, the G.1 prototype was fitted with hydraulic dive brakes under the wings. Flight tests revealed that the G.1 was capable of diving at over 644 km/h (400 mph) and had aerobatic capabilities. Swedish Air Force officer Captain Björn Bjuggren tested the G.1 in over 20 dives and reported favourably on its effectiveness as a dive bomber. Orders for G.1 Wasp aircraft came from Spain (26 ordered) and Sweden (18), while the Mercury variant was ordered by Denmark (12) with a production license that was never used, and Sweden (72). Although Belgium, Finland, Turkey, Hungary and Switzerland showed interest, they never placed firm orders.

The Luchtvaartafdeeling ordered 36 G.I's with 541 kW (825 hp) Bristol Mercury VIII engines, the standard engine used by the Dutch Air Force in the Fokker D.XXI fighter, to equip two squadrons. Only the first four examples were built as three-seaters intended for ground-attack, with the remainder being completed as two-seat fighters. Before hostilities, 26 G.Is were operational in the 3rd Jachtvliegtuigafdeling (JaVA) at Rotterdam (Waalhaven Airfield), and 4th JaVA Fighter Group at Bergen near Alkmaar. The aircraft were involved in border patrols and to ensure neutrality, on 20 March 1940, a G.1 from 4th JaVA forced down an Armstrong Whitworth Whitley from 77 Squadron, RAF Bomber Command when it strayed into Dutch air space.

=== Battle of the Netherlands ===
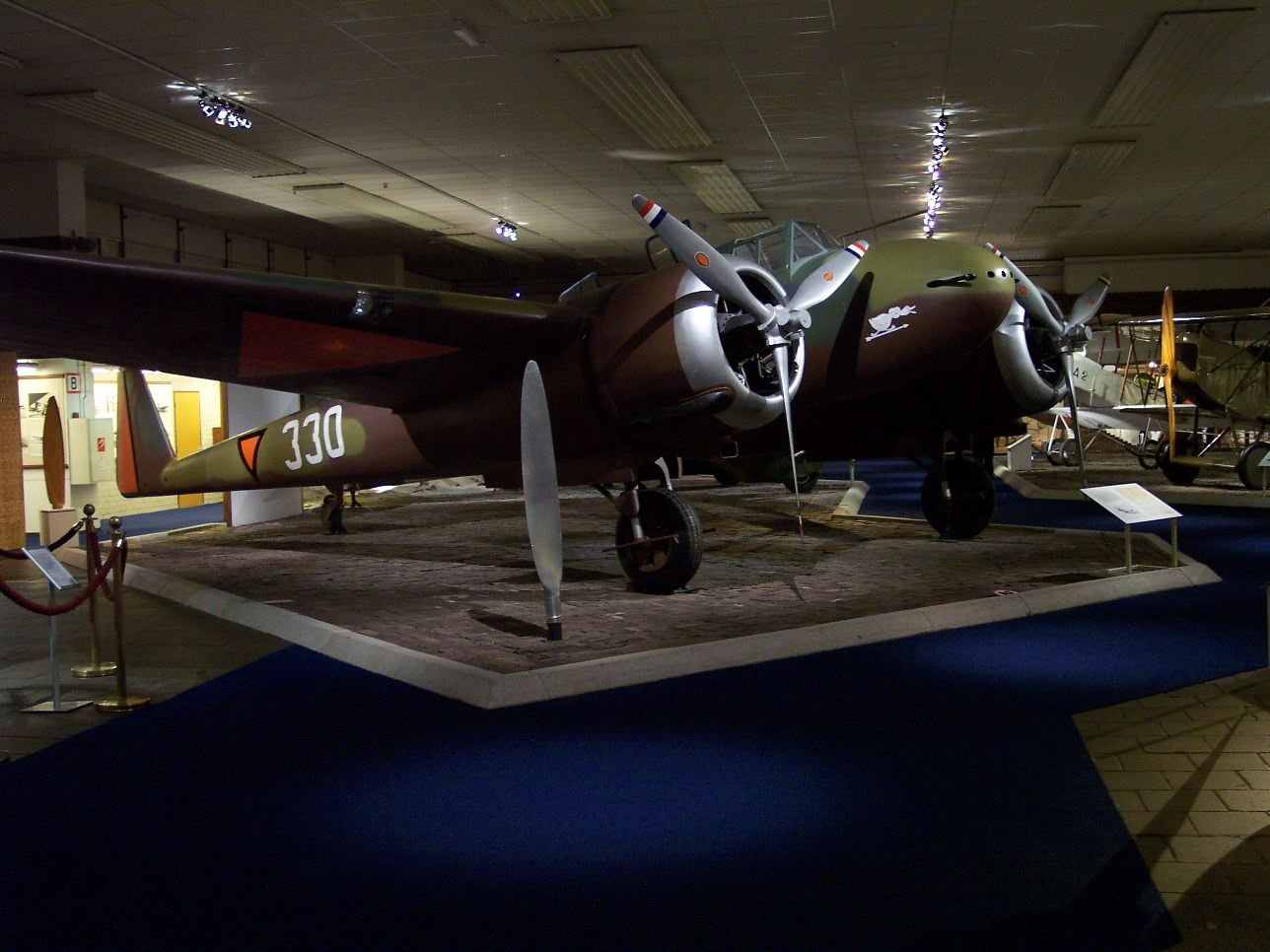
Replica of the G.I at the Dutch Air Force Museum in Soesterberg, The Netherlands.

On 10 May 1940, when Nazi Germany invaded the Netherlands, 23 G.1 aircraft were serviceable while production of Spain's order of the G.1 Wasp variant continued with a dozen aircraft completed, awaiting armament. The German invasion started with an early morning (03:50 hours) Luftwaffe attack on the Dutch airfields. While the 4th JaVA received a devastating blow, losing all but one of its aircraft, eight 3rd JaVA G.1 fighters of the Waalhaven airbase in Rotterdam, that were already fully fuelled and armed, scrambled in time and engaged several German aircraft. The surviving aircraft continued to fly, but with mounting losses, bringing their numbers down to three airworthy aircraft by the end of the first day. Despite the heavy losses of 4th JaVA, some of the planes could be kept in the air by scavenging parts from various planes. The available G.1 fighters were mainly deployed in ground attack missions, strafing advancing German infantry units, but also used to attack Junkers Ju 52/3m transports. Although reports are fragmentary and inaccurate as to the results, G.1 fighters were employed over Rotterdam and the Hague, contributing to the loss of 167 Ju 52s, scoring up to 14 confirmed aerial kills. The highest scoring G.1 pilot was Gerben Sonderman, with four victories.

=== Aftermath ===
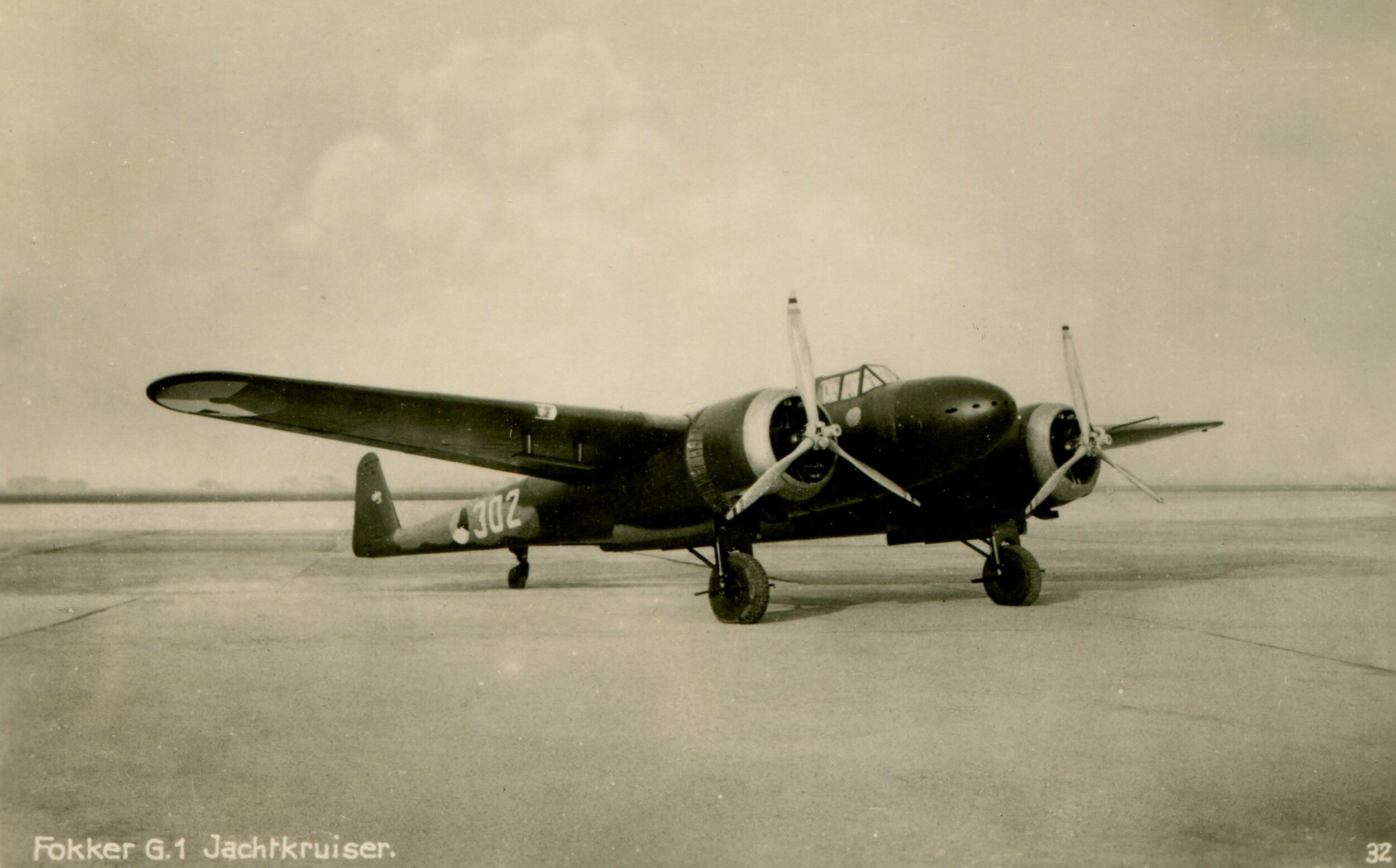

At the conclusion of hostilities, several G.Is were captured by the Germans, with the remainder of the Spanish order completed at the Fokker plant by mid-1941 for the G.1s to be assigned as fighter trainers for Bf 110 crews at Wiener Neustadt. For the next two years, Flugzeugführerschule (B) 8 flew the G.1 Wasp until attrition grounded the fleet.

On 5 May 1941, a Fokker test pilot, Hidde Leegstra, accompanied by engineer (and member of the Fokker Board of Directors) Ir. Piet Vos, managed to fly a G.1 to England. The crew's subterfuge involved acquiring additional fuel for the supposed test flight as well as ducking into clouds to deter the trailing Luftwaffe aircraft from following. After landing in England, the G.1 was conscripted by Phillips and Powis Aircraft, later Miles Aircraft. The company had designed an all-wooden fighter-bomber, and was interested in the G.1 wing structure and its resistance to the rigours of a British climate. Despite being left outdoors for the remainder of the war, the G.1 survived only to be scrapped after 1945.

There are no surviving G.Is today, although a replica has been built and is on display at the Dutch Nationaal Militair Museum (National Military Museum).

== Variants ==
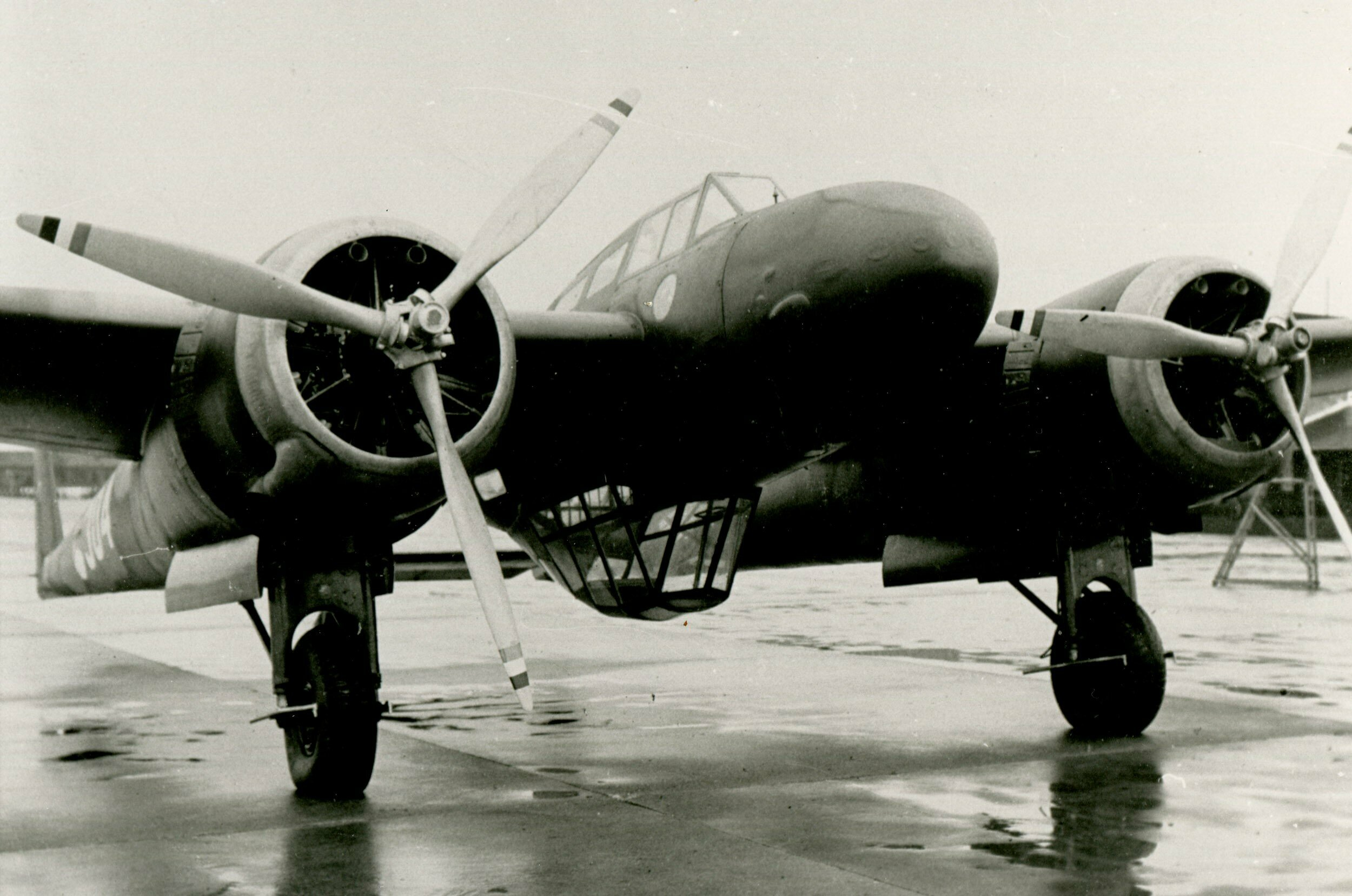
An unarmed reconnaissance model with glass observation cupola (bath tub) in the aircraft's belly.

- G.I: Prototype, powered by two Hispano-Suiza 14AB-02/03 engines; one built, c/n 5419. Armed with two 7.92 mm machine guns and two 23 mm Madsen automatic cannons.
- G.IA Mercury: Two and three-seat models, powered by Bristol Mercury VIII engines; 36 built, c/n 5521–5556.
- G.IB Wasp: Two-seat, smaller "export model" (Note: The G.I Wasp had a significantly smaller fuselage length and reduced wingspan/area. G.1 Wasp length: 10.38m (33.9 ft), wingspan: 16.50m (54.2 ft), wing area: 35.70 m^{2} (384.27) ft^{2}.), powered by Pratt & Whitney SB4-G Twin Wasp Junior; 26 built, c/n 5557–5581.
- B 26: Swedish dive bomber variant of the G.1 Mercury. Originally designated B 7, 18 were ordered with 77 (later 83–95) more planned. Due to the cancellation of the 12 Swedish S 10s (Breguet Bre 694) by the French government due to the German invasion of France it was decided to let the first batch of 12 aircraft become reconnaissance planes called S 13. The B 26 was unique compared to the Dutch variant. Its armament would consist of four 13.2 mm akan m/39 auto cannons in the nose and an 8 mm ksp m/22-37R machine gun for the gunner. It would be equipped with a bomb bay that could hold eight 50 kg bombs or a single 250 kg bomb with a bomb fork along with hard points under the wings for four more 50 kg bombs (two under each wing). The B 26 could not be delivered to Sweden due to the invasion of the Netherlands. A mock up was apparently built by Fokker.
- S 13: Swedish reconnaissance variant of the G.1 Mercury. 12 of the original 18 B 26s where re designated S 13 and where reordered with glass domes called "bath tubs" where a third crew member would sit and scout. Armament would be similar to the B 26 but 2 of the 13.2 mm akan m/39 guns were replaced with 8 mm ksp m/22 ones. The glass domes could also be removed and replaced with a bomb bay. Just like the B 26 none were delivered due to the invasion of the Netherlands.

== Operators ==
Netherlands

- Luchtvaartafdeling (LVA)

Germany

- Luftwaffe (small numbers) (Note: The Luftwaffe operated between 35 and 40 Fokker G.1s.)

== Specifications (Fokker G.I Mercury) ==

Data from Nederlandse Vliegtuig Encyclopedie No.12: Fokker G-1 (2nd edition); The Fokker G-1

General characteristics

- Crew: 2–3
- Length: 10.87 m (35 ft 8 in)
- Wingspan: 17.16 m (56 ft 4 in)
- Height: 3.8 m (12 ft 6 in)
- Wing area: 38.3 m^{2} (412 sq ft)
- Empty weight: 3,325 kg (7,330 lb)
- Gross weight: 4,800 kg (10,582 lb)
- Max takeoff weight: 5,000 kg (11,023 lb)
- Fuel capacity: 1,050 L (277 US gal; 231 imp gal)
- Powerplant: 2 × Bristol Mercury VIII 9-cylinder air-cooled radial piston engines, 540 kW (730 hp) each at 2,650 rpm - takeoff power

830 hp (620 kW) at 4,100 m (13,500 ft) at 2,750 rpm - maximum continuous power

- Propellers: 3-bladed controllable-pitch propellers

Performance

- Maximum speed: 475 km/h (295 mph, 256 kn) at 4,100 m (13,500 ft)
- Range: 1,510 km (940 mi, 820 nmi)
- Service ceiling: 10,000 m (33,000 ft)
- Rate of climb: 13.5 m/s (2,660 ft/min) 5,000 m (16,000 ft) in 6 minutes 20 seconds
- Wing loading: 125.3 kg/m^{2} (25.7 lb/sq ft)
- Power/mass: 0.22 kW/kg (0.13 hp/lb)

Armament

- 8 × 7.9 mm (0.31 in) forward-firing FN-Browning machine-guns in the nose
- 1 × 7.9 mm (0.31 in) machine gun in rear turret
- 300 kg (660 lb) of bombs (G.1 Wasp could take 400 kg (880 lb))

or

- 2 × 23 mm Madsen cannons in nose
- 2 × Unspecified forward firing machine-guns
- 1 × Unspecified machine-gun firing aft

== See also ==
- Twin-boom aircraft

Aircraft of comparable role, configuration, and era

- Bristol Beaufighter
- Focke-Wulf Fw 189 Uhu
- Focke-Wulf Fw 187 Falke
- Kawasaki Ki-45
- Lockheed P-38 Lightning
- Messerschmitt Bf 110
- Potez 630

Related lists

- List of aircraft of World War II
- List of fighter aircraft

== Bibliography ==
- Green, William, ed. (April 1967). "Le Faucheur... Fokker's Formidable G.1". Flying Review International. Vol. 22, no. 8. ISSN 0957-3003.
- Gerdessen, Frits; Kalkman, Karel; Oostveen, Cor; Vredeling, Willem (2024). Fokker G-1 jachtkruiser (Part 1). Amsterdam: Lanasta. ISBN 978-9-46-456396-2.
- Green, William (1961). Warplanes of the Second World War: Fighters. Vol. III. London: Macdonald. OCLC 55407936.
- Hazewinkel, Harm J. (March 1980). "Fokker G-1 (2)". Le Fana de l'Aviation (in French) (124): 30–34. ISSN 0757-4169.
- Hooftman, Hugo (1981). Fokker G-1. Nederlandse Vliegtuig Encyclopedie (in Dutch). Vol. XII (2nd ed.). Bennekom, NL: Cockpit-Uitgeverij.
- Ketley, Barry; Rolfe, Mark (1996). Luftwaffe Fledglings 1935–1945: Luftwaffe Training Units and their Aircraft. Aldershot: Hikoki Publications. ISBN 978-0-9519899-2-0.
- Taylor, John W. R. (1969). "Fokker G.1". Combat Aircraft of the World from 1909 to the Present. New York: G.P. Putnam's Sons. ISBN 0-425-03633-2.
- Van der Klaauw, Bart (1966). The Fokker G-1. Aircraft in Profile. Vol. VI. Windsor: Profile Publications. OCLC 45031033.
