= Military Karl-Friedrich Merit Order =

Military order of merit

Military Karl-Friedrich Merit Order Militär Karl-Friedrich-Verdienstorden
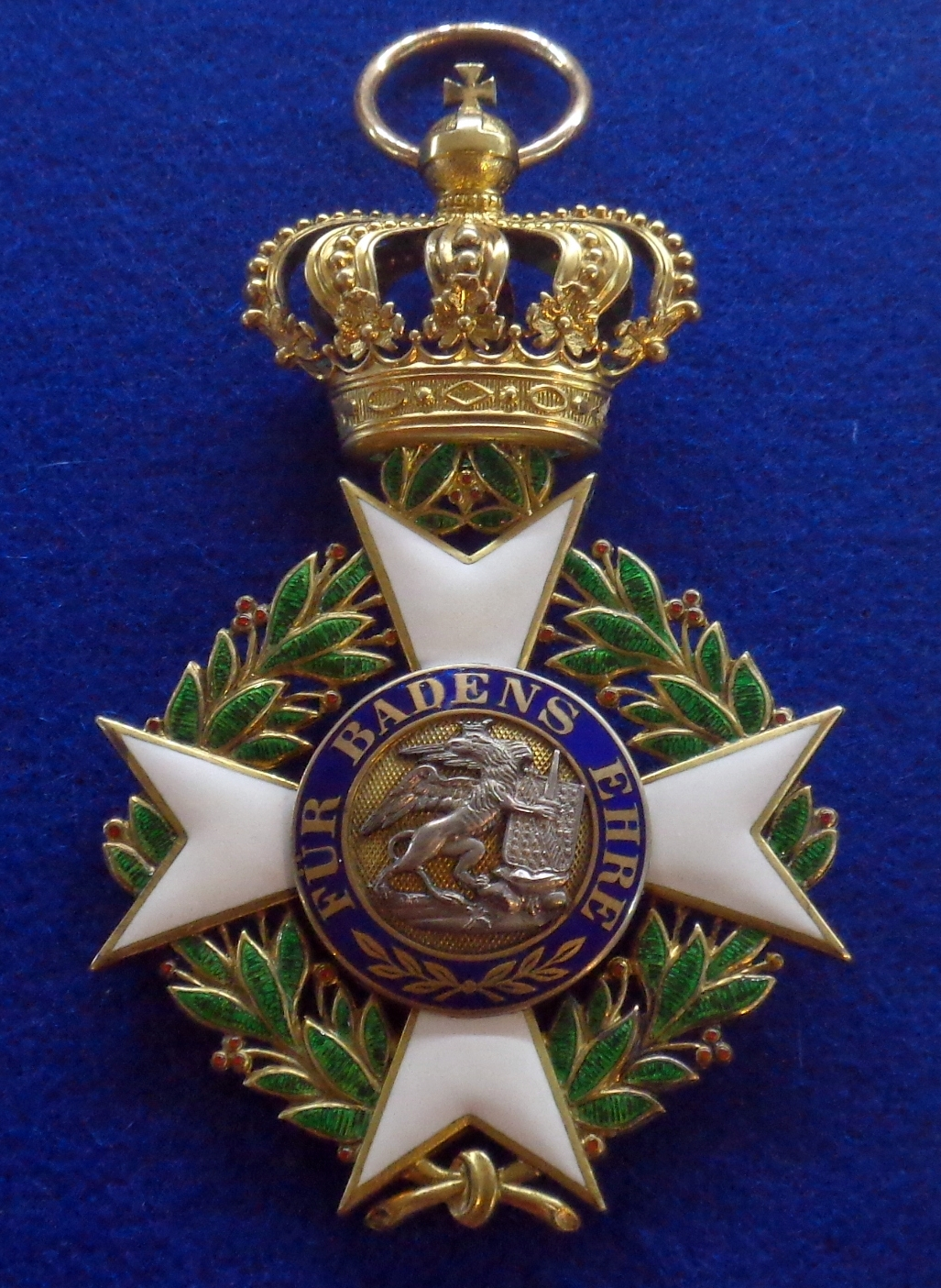
- Badge of the grand cross
- Awarded for: Outstanding military merit
- Presented by: the Grand Duchy of Baden
- Status: No longer awarded
- Established: 5 October 1805
- Ribbon of the order

Precedence
- Next (lower): Order of Berthold the First

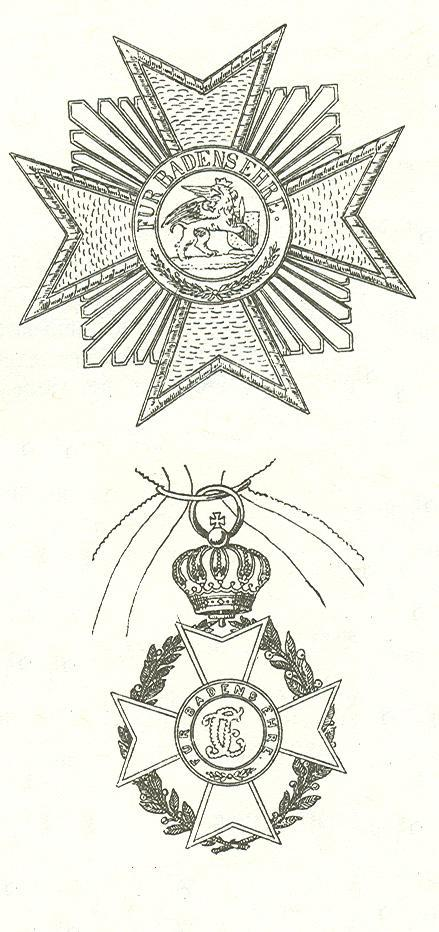
Star and Grand Cross of the order

The Military Karl-Friedrich Merit Order (German: Militär Karl-Friedrich-Verdienstorden) was a military order of merit of the Grand Duchy of Baden. Established 5 October 1805 by Charles Frederick, Elector and later Grand Duke of Baden, the order recognized outstanding military merit amongst military officers. In 1807, medals associated with the order were added as the highest awards for bravery for non-commissioned and enlisted soldiers.

== Classes ==
- Grand Crosses
- Commanders
- Knights

== Recipients ==
=== Grand Crosses ===
- Albert of Saxony
- Albert I, Prince of Monaco
- Albrecht, Duke of Württemberg
- Friedrich von Beck-Rzikowsky
- Prince Charles of Prussia
- Frederick Francis II, Grand Duke of Mecklenburg-Schwerin
- Frederick I, Grand Duke of Baden
- Frederick III, German Emperor
- Prince Friedrich Karl of Prussia (1828–1885)
- François Joseph Lefebvre
- Louis II, Grand Duke of Baden
- Louis II, Prince of Monaco
- Grand Duke Michael Nikolaevich of Russia
- Helmuth von Moltke the Elder
- Nicholas I of Russia
- Albrecht von Roon
- Rupprecht, Crown Prince of Bavaria
- August von Werder
- Wilhelm II, German Emperor
- Prince William of Baden
- William I, German Emperor
- Prince William of Baden (1829–1897)
- William, Prince of Hohenzollern
- Ferdinand von Wrangel
- Friedrich Graf von Wrangel

=== Commanders ===
- Prince Albert of Prussia (1837–1906)
- Gustav Friedrich von Beyer
- Leonhard Graf von Blumenthal
- Prince Eitel Friedrich of Prussia
- Adolf von Glümer
- Karl von der Gröben
- Prince Maximilian of Baden
- Friedrich Karl von Tettenborn
- Heinrich Wilhelm von Hinckeldey

=== Knights ===
- Gustav von Alvensleben
- Georg von Bismarck
- Karl-Heinrich Brenner
- Nikolaus zu Dohna-Schlodien
- Albert Dossenbach
- Hermann Frommherz
- Hermann Göring
- Wilhelm von Hahnke
- Hermann, Prince of Hohenlohe-Langenburg
- Bruno Loerzer
- Eduard von Pestel
- Otto Wagener
- Alfred von Waldersee

=== Unclassified ===
- Hermann Habich
- Emil Meinecke
- Karl Ritscherle
