= Camille Crémer =

French general

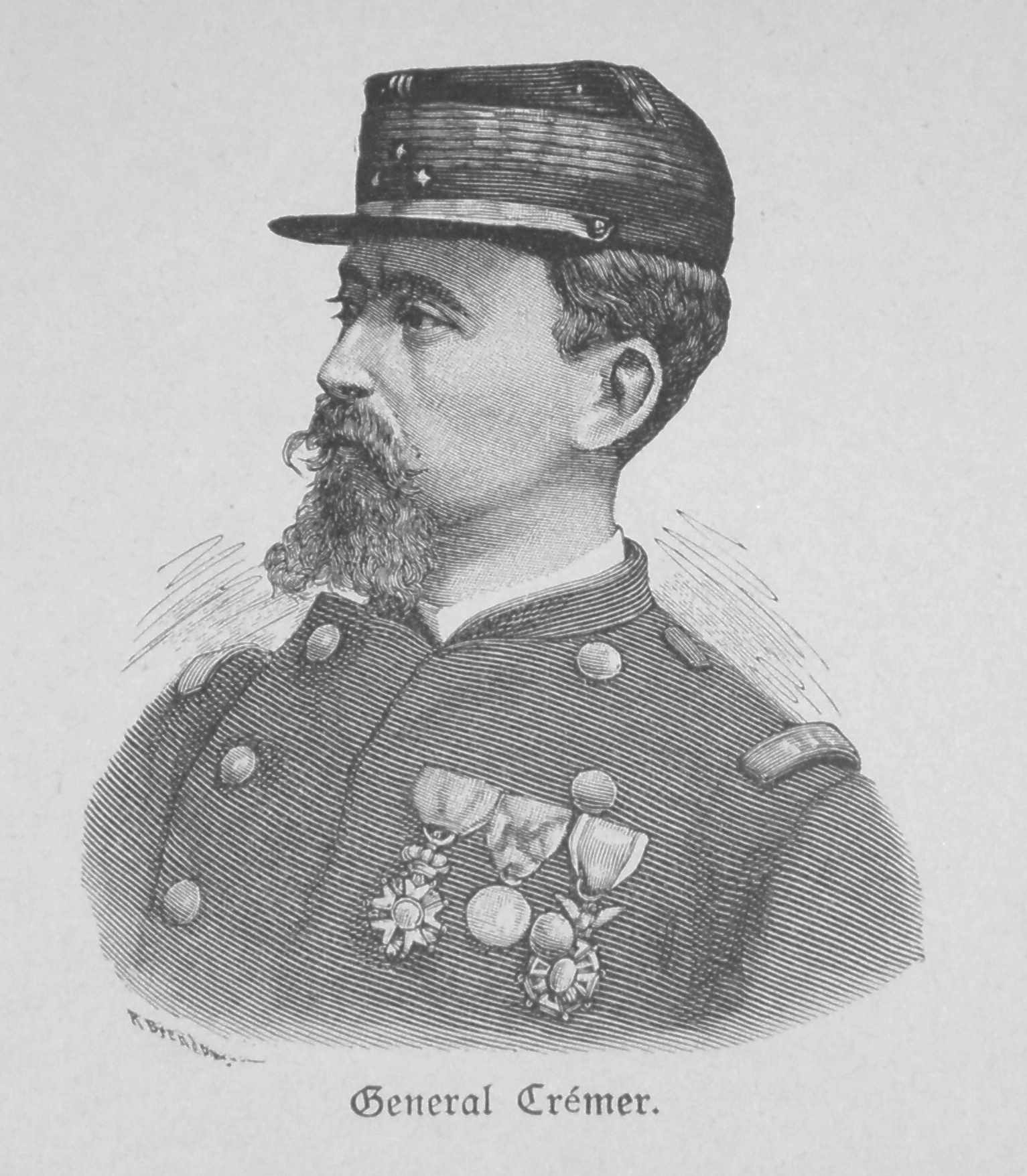
- Born: 6 August 1840; Sarreguemines, Moselle, Kingdom of France
- Died: 2 April 1876 (aged 35); Paris, French Republic
- Military career
- Allegiance: French Empire; French Republic
- Branch: French Army
- Service years: 1857–1871
- Conflicts: Second French intervention in Mexico: Battle of Jiquilpan; Franco-Prussian War: Siege of Metz; Battle of Chateauneuf; Battle of Nuits Saint Georges
- Awards: Commemorative medal of the Mexico Expedition; Legion of Honor (Officer)

Camille Crémer (1840–1876) was a French divisionary general in the Franco-Prussian War.

== Biography ==
Camille Crémer was born on 6 August 1840 in Sarreguemines in Moselle. Coming from a modest background, he prepared for the special military school of Saint-Cyr in 1857. Two years later, he left it as a second lieutenant. First assigned to the 95th Infantry Regiment, he entered the staff school in 1860. In 1862, Lieutenant Crémer was assigned to the 10th cuirassiers. Well noted, he was assigned to the Empress's Dragons the following year. In 1864, he was assigned to the 1st Zouaves with whom he fought in Mexico. On 24 October 1864 Camille Crémer distinguished himself in combat at Jiquilpan. He received the Medal of Mexico, before being promoted "Knight of Our Lady of Guadalupe". Back in France, he was promoted to captain in January 1866. After a quick transition to the 10th artillery regiment, he was assigned to the Staff of the 21st Military Division. Aide-de-camp to General Justin Clinchant, Camille Crémer was promoted Knight of the Legion of Honor in 1870.

During the Franco-Prussian War, he took part in the fighting around Metz. But he was captured around late October and taken prisoner in Metz, he was taken to an internment camp in Germany from where he escaped for his word of honor to not continue serving against Germany and so, he returned to France via the Palatinate, Grand Duchy of Baden and Switzerland. He joined Gambetta who appointed him brigadier general. He became head of the 3rd Infantry Division 24th Army Corps. In December 1870, General Crémer fought in Bligny-sur-Ouche, then in Nuits-Saint-Georges, near Dijon. He took an active part in the battles of the Army of the East, but did not go to Switzerland during his retirement, preferring, like Rear Admiral Penhoat and General Billot, to join Lyon via the Highlands. from the Jura in early February 1871.

In February 1871, Camille Crémer was appointed general of division in Chambéry, before being demoted and relieved of his functions in July, by the commission of revision of ranks, for having resumed service when he had "signed the reverse" in Metz.

General Crémer was demoted to the rank of squadron leader he had at the start of the war. He immediately addressed a public letter to the Minister of War:

"I therefore have the honor to send you my resignation, contenting myself as a reward for fifteen years of service with having my property confiscated, my father exiled, my brother killed and my homeland delivered. So much happiness makes me fear those which the future holds for me, and I prefer to wait as a simple citizen for the opportunity to wage war on the Prussians again. Please accept, Mr. Minister, the assurance of all the respect with which I have the honor to be your very devoted and obedient servant. Crémer, Lorrain annexed and ex-Gambettist general. "

This open letter is worth to him to be put in reform "for serious fault against the discipline" in November 1871.

Crémer was offered, on 20 March 1871 by the central committee of the National Guard, the command of the National Guard of Paris. He hesitated to accept and the post was given to another by the Communards. At the same time, he had influenced to release Generals Chanzy and Langourian 4 prisoners from La Commune.

Gnawed by spite and bitterness, he wrote in January 1872: "In 13 battles or combats I had the good fortune to beat the Prussians 13 times". General Crémer died in Paris on 2 April 1876.

== Bibliography ==
- Camille Crémer on VIAF
- Biographical note on saint-cyr.org (42^{e} promotion, de l'Indoustan)
- Notice and photography on military-photos.com
