= Karl von der Gröben =

Prussian general

Graf Karl von der Gröben
- Born: 17 September 1788; Schrengen, East Prussia
- Died: 13 July 1876 (aged 87); Neudörschen near Marienwerder, West Prussia
- Military career
- Allegiance: Kingdom of Prussia (Russia) Russian Empire
- Service years: 1806–1858
- Rank: General of the Cavalry
- Conflicts: Napoleonic Wars

Karl Graf von der Gröben (17 September 1788 – 13 July 1876) was a Prussian general.

== Biography ==
Von der Gröben was born in Schrengen, East Prussia (today Linkowo, Poland) and joined the Prussian Army in 1806. He served under Anton Wilhelm von L'Estocq in the Napoleonic war of 1806/07. In 1812 Gröben left the Prussian Army after Prussia had to deploy subsidiary troops in Napoleon's Russian campaign and joined the Imperial Russian Army instead. He took part in the Battles of Lützen and Bautzen and returned to Prussian service, promoted to a Rittmeister in the Prussian General Staff in August 1813. Von der Gröben was wounded throughout the Battle of Dresden and fought in the Battle of Kulm and the Battle of Leipzig. In 1814 Gröben fought at Luxembourg and was again wounded at Gué-à-Trème. In July 1814 he was promoted to a Major and fought in the Battles of Ligny and Waterloo in 1815. He became a lieutenant colonel and served in the Prussian High Command of the Rhine at Koblenz.

In 1817 von der Gröben served in Breslau as Chief of Staff and in 1824 as Chief of Staff of the II Army Corps. In 1829 he became the personal adjutant of the Prussian crown prince, the future Frederick William IV of Prussia and commander of the 3rd Cavalry Brigade in 1834 and the 14th Division in 1838.

Von der Gröben was promoted to lieutenant general in 1842 and became the general adjutant of Frederick William IV of Prussia in 1843. Throughout the Spring of Nations in March 1848 he commanded the VII Army Corps and fought against the revolutionary forces in Baden in 1849 as the Commanding Officer of the Prussian Army of the Rhine. He was promoted to the rank of General of the Cavalry in 1852.

In 1854 he became a member of the Prussian House of Lords and retired from military service in 1858. He lived on his estate of Neudörfchen near Marienwerder (Kwidzyn), where he died.

Gröben was married to Thusnelda née von Dörnberg and had five sons.

== Honours and awards ==
- Kingdom of Prussia: Pour le Mérite (military), 15 July 1808; with Oak Leaves, July 1849; with Crown, 13 January 1857
- Baden: Commander of the Military Karl-Friedrich Merit Order, 1849
