= Mikoyan-Gurevich DIS =

1941 Soviet heavy fighter prototype

DIS
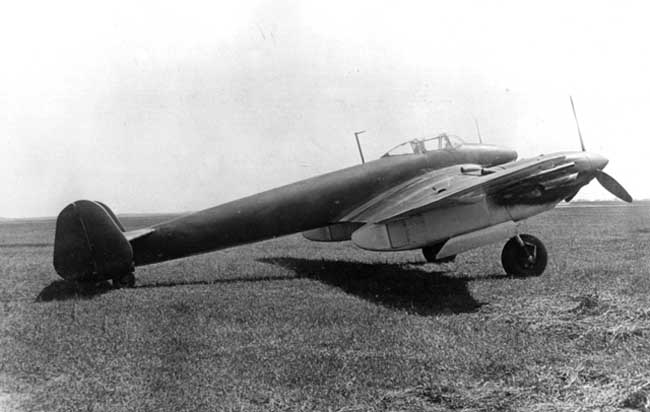
- DIS-T prototype with Mikulin AM-37 engines

General information
- Type: Heavy fighter; Escort fighter
- National origin: Soviet Union
- Manufacturer: Mikoyan-Gurevich OKB
- Designer: Artem Mikoyan, Mikhail Gurevich
- Status: Cancelled
- Number built: 2

History
- First flight: 11 June 1941

The Mikoyan-Gurevich DIS (Russian: Дальний истребитель сопровождения/ Dalnij Istrebitel' Soprovozhdenya – "long-range escort fighter") was a prototype Soviet heavy fighter of World War II, envisioned to serve primarily in the escort fighter role. The service designation MiG-5 was reserved for the production version of the aircraft. Competing designs in the USSR included the Grushin Gr-1, Polikarpov TIS and Tairov Ta-3.

It was intended to develop reconnaissance and bomber versions but these plans were disrupted by Operation Barbarossa, the German invasion of the USSR in June 1941. The project failed due to its disappointing Mikulin AM-37 engines and when a second prototype was built with M-82 radial engines its performance was mediocre. The design was cancelled in 1943 after at least two prototypes had been built.

== Design and development ==
The NKAP (Narodnyy komissariat aviatsionnoy promyshlennosti—People's Ministry of the Aircraft Industry) requested on 7 October 1940 that the OKO (opytno-konstrooktorskiy otdel—Experimental Design Department) of Factory (Zavod) No. 1, which would later become the Mikoyan-Gurevich design bureau (OKB) begin work on a twin-engined long-range, single-seat escort fighter intended to use the AM-37 engine, then under development by Mikulin. It also requested that specifications, along with a model, be ready to be discussed on 12 November of that year. Three days later Mikoyan and Gurevich were ordered to produce three prototypes to undergo State acceptance trials on 1 August, 1 September and 1 November 1941. After the meeting, the NKAP broadened its roles to include bombing, torpedo attack, reconnaissance and interdiction.

A low-wing, twin-engined, twin-tailed monoplane, the DIS was of mixed construction. The front section was built from duralumin, the middle section was a wooden monocoque and the rear section was steel tubes covered with a duralumin skin. The twin tails were wooden and had an electrically operated variable-incidence horizontal stabilizer. The elevators had duralumin frames, but were covered by fabric. The two-spar wing was made in three pieces. The center section was metal, but the outer panels were wooden with fabric-covered ailerons and veneer-covered Schrenk flaps. The wing had leading edge slats along two-thirds of its length. The main undercarriage retracted rearwards into the rear of the engine nacelles and the tailwheel retracted into the rear fuselage. The Mikulin AM-37 inline engines were slung underneath the wings with the engine oil coolers mounted in the outer wing panels. The air intakes for the engine superchargers were located in the wing leading edge. The pilot was provided with a glass panel on the underside of the nose to improve his downward visibility, and he was protected by armor up to 9 mm (0.35 in) thick at the front, rear, sides and underside of his seat. The fuel capacity was 1,920 litres (422 imp gal; 507 US gal) in two protected tanks behind the pilot, and another four in the wings.

The DIS was intended to be armed with a 23 mm (0.91 in) VYa cannon with 200 rounds in a pod beneath the nose, but the VVS preferred the Taubin MP-6 cannon. The DIS was to carry two of them with 120 rounds per gun, but they proved to be a failure and the aircraft reverted to the original VYa cannon. Each wing root was to have a synchronized 12.7 mm (0.50 in) Berezin UBS machine gun with 300 rounds mounted below a pair of 7.62 mm (0.300 in) ShKAS machine guns with 1000 rounds per gun. The gun pod could be removed and bombs up to 1,000 kg (2,200 lb) or a torpedo could be carried instead.

=== Flight testing ===
The first prototype, with the internal designation of T, made its first flight on 11 June 1941. Its initial flight tests, conducted by the manufacturer between 1 July and 5 October, were a disappointment as it could reach only a speed of 560 km/h (348 mph) at 7,500 metres (24,606 ft), 104 km/h (65 mph) slower than estimated. The three-bladed 3.1-metre (10 ft) AV-5L-114 propellers were exchanged for four-bladed 3.1-metre (10 ft) AV-9B-L-149 propellers and the engine installation was redesigned, after wind tunnel tests by TsAGI (Central Aero and Hydrodynamics Institute), which revealed that the poorly designed engine accessories were the major cause of the excess drag. After modifications, the aircraft reached 610 km/h (380 mph) at an altitude of 6,800 metres (22,310 ft). Its time to 5,000 metres (16,404 ft) was 5.5 minutes. Even with the improvements the LII (Lyotno-Issledovatel'skiy Institoot—Flight Research Institute) did not recommend production, but recommended that development and testing should continue. The German advance on Moscow in October 1941 forced the Institute and the DIS to evacuate to Kazan while the OKO and its factory went to Kuibyshev. The failure of the AM-37 to enter production doomed the project, albeit temporarily.

The OKO, along with all other aircraft designers, had been directed to use the Shvetsov ASh-82 radial engine as a backup engine for their products in May 1941, but the evacuation disrupted the production of this version, known internally as the IT and it was not built until the autumn of 1942. Aside from the engines, it differed from the T in small respects. Its tailcone was split vertically to use as an air brake and the armament was revised to consist of two VYa cannon in the undernose pod with 150 rounds each and four Berezin UBK machine guns mounted in the wing roots. It made its first flight on 28 January 1943 and demonstrated a top speed of 604 km/h (375 mph) and a time to 5,000 meters of 6.3 minutes. Flight testing was stopped on 10 February when the floatless carburetors had to be sent to TsIAM (Tsentrahl'nyy Institoot Aviatsionnovo Motorostroyeniya—Central Institute of Aviation Motors) for adjustment. There were continuous problems with these and they delayed the entire project until it was cancelled in October 1943.

The service designation MiG-5 was reserved for the production version of this aircraft, as demonstrated in the NKAP order of 2 October 1941, which instructed Zavod No. 1 to begin manufacture of the MiG-5 after the completion of its State acceptance tests. Other known designations for the aircraft include the DIS-200 and Idzeliye 71, its factory designation. The bomber version, if it had entered production, might have been known as the MiG-2.

Two prototypes are known to have been built, but some records suggest that others were also built. The original order called for three aircraft and was amended later for two additional aircraft with M-82 engines. Some sources quote dates for the latter version's first flight of January 1942 and 15 October 1941, which could be an indication that two of the latter version were completed, or they could simply be clerical errors.

== Variants ==
- DIS – basic designation.
- DIS-T – initial prototype with 2 × Mikulin AM-37 inline engines with 1,400 hp each.
- DIS-IT – second prototype with 2 × Shvetsov M-82F radial engines with 1,700 hp each; other subtle revisions added to improved performance.
- MiG-5 – reserved Soviet Air Forces designation for production-quality aircraft (not used).

== Specifications (DIS-T) ==
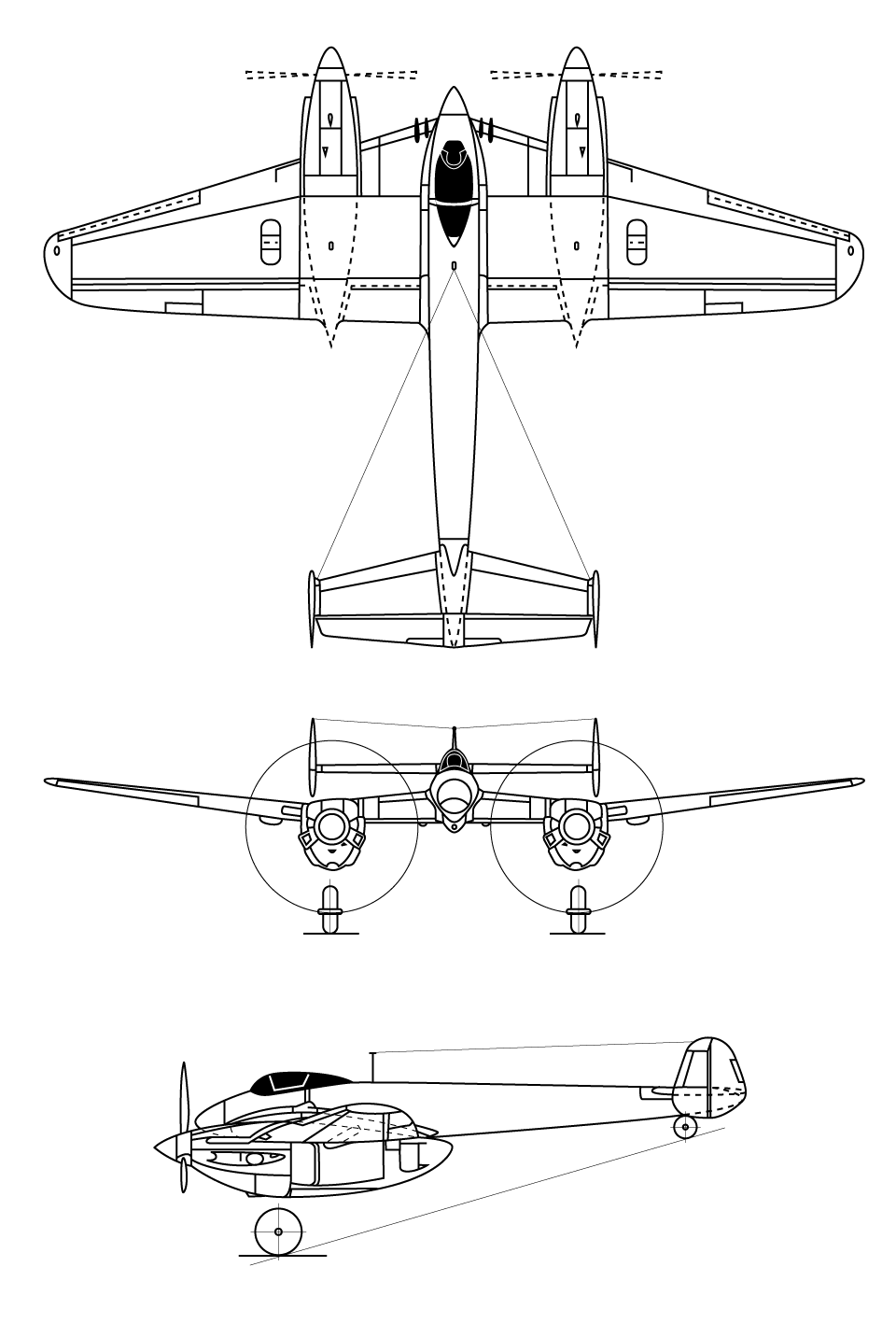
MiG5 (DIS-200)

Data from OKB Mikoyan: A History of the Design Bureau and its Aircraft

General characteristics

- Crew: 1
- Length: 11.2 m (36 ft 9 in)
- Wingspan: 15.3 m (50 ft 2 in)
- Height: 3.4 m (11 ft 2 in)
- Wing area: 38.9 m^{2} (419 sq ft)
- Airfoil: Clark YH
- Empty weight: 6,140 kg (13,536 lb)
- Gross weight: 8,060 kg (17,769 lb)
- Fuel capacity: 1,920 kg (4,230 lb)
- Powerplant: 2 × Mikulin AM-37 V-12 liquid-cooled piston engines, 1,044 kW (1,400 hp) each
- Propellers: 3-bladed constant-speed propellers

Performance

- Maximum speed: 610 km/h (380 mph, 330 kn) at 6,800 m (22,300 ft)
- Range: 2,280 km (1,420 mi, 1,230 nmi)
- Service ceiling: 10,900 m (35,800 ft)
- Rate of climb: 15.24 m/s (3,000 ft/min)
- Time to altitude: 5,000 m (16,404 ft) in 5 minutes 30 seconds
- Wing loading: 207.2 kg/m^{2} (42.4 lb/sq ft)

Armament

- Guns:
- 1 × 23 mm Volkov-Yartsev VYa-23 autocannon
- 2 × 12.7 mm Berezin UB machine guns
- 4 × 7.62 mm ShKAS machine guns

== Comparable aircraft ==
- de Havilland Mosquito
- Tupolev Tu-2
- Petlyakov Pe-2
- Focke-Wulf Fw 187
- Lockheed P-38 Lightning
- Messerschmitt Bf 110
- Nakajima J5N
- Westland Whirlwind
