= Adolf von Glümer =

- Heinrich Karl Ludwig Adolf von Glümer
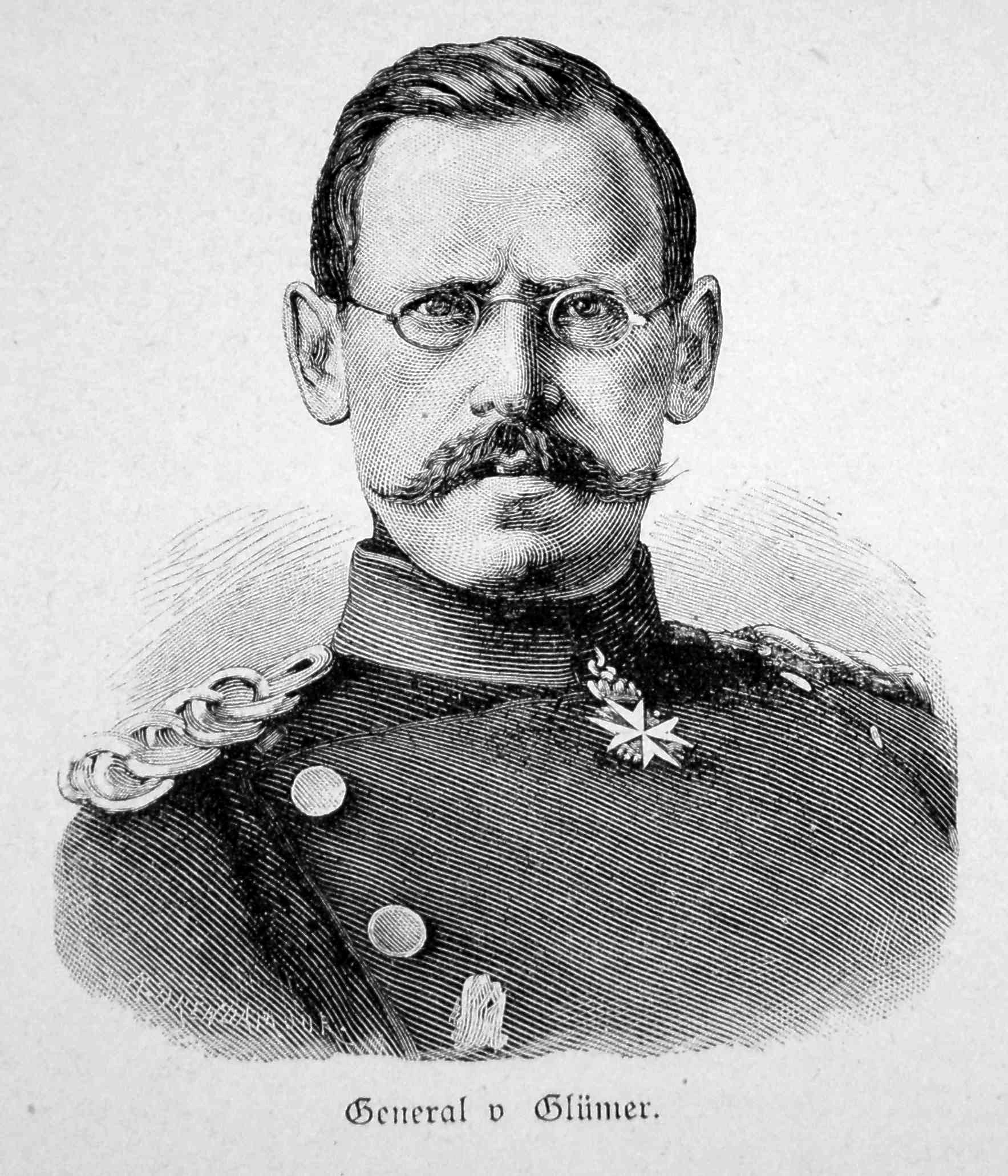
- Born: 5 June 1814; Lengefeld, Province of Saxony, Kingdom of Prussia
- Died: 3 January 1896 (aged 81); Freiburg im Breisgau, Grand Duchy of Baden, German Empire
- Education: Prussian Staff College
- Military career
- Allegiance: Kingdom of Prussia; North German Confederation; German Empire
- Branch: Prussian Army; Imperial German Army
- Service years: 1831–1873
- Rank: Generalleutnant char. General der Infanterie
- Commands: 13th Division; Baden Field Division; 29th Division
- Conflicts: Baden Revolution; Austro-Prussian War; Campaign of the Main; Battle of Helmstadt; Battle of Roßbrunn; Franco-Prussian War; Battle of Spicheren; Battle of Borny–Colombey; Battle of Gravelotte; Battle of Nuits Saint Georges
- Awards: Pour le Merite; Military Karl-Friedrich Merit Order

Heinrich Karl Ludwig Adolf von Glümer (5 June 1814 – 3 January 1896), also known as Adolf von Glümer, was a Prussian general who served in the Austro-Prussian and Franco-Prussian wars.

== Biography ==
=== Family ===
He was the son of the Prussian captain a. D. Christian Ludwig von Glümer (born 1772) and his wife Wilhelmine, née Spohr.

Glümer married Karoline Herzog on 29 June 1847 in Halberstadt. The later Prussian Major General Weddo von Glümer (1848–1918) emerged from the marriage.

=== Military career ===
On 1 March 1831 Glümer joined the 26th Infantry Regiment of the Prussian Army, where he was promoted to Second Lieutenant on 14 June 1832 and attended the Prussian Staff College from 1835 to 1838. He was assigned to the Guards Artillery Brigade from 1842 to 1843 and then to the topographical department of the Great General Staff. Between 1847 and 1851 he was adjutant of the 7th Landwehr Brigade, participated in the 1849 campaign against the insurgents in Baden, in 1856 became a Major in the staff of the 11th Division and in 1858 he was transferred to the VI. Army Corps staff.

In 1859 Glümer became the commander of the Fusilier Battalion in the 23rd Infantry Regiment in Neisse, then director of the division school there and soon afterwards a lieutenant colonel. In October 1861 he became a colonel in command of the 6th (1st West Prussian) Grenadier Regiment.

During the Austro-Prussian War, Glümer was appointed major general and led a brigade in General Gustav Friedrich von Beyer's division as part of the Army of the Main, which took part in the Campaign of the Main and the battles of Hammelburg, Helmstadt, Roßbrunn and Würzburg. After the campaign, Glümer became the commander of the 32nd Infantry Brigade in Trier and took command of the 13th Division on 18 July 1870.

During the Franco-Prussian War, he took part in the Battle of Spichern, occupied Forbach on 7 August and fought in the Battle of Borny–Colombey and the Battle of Gravelotte as well as in many small battles before Metz, until he was appointed to lead the Baden Field Division on 3 October. Initially Glümer was ill, and was only able to take command in Dijon on 9 December, fighting the victorious Battle of Nuits Saint Georges on 18 December. In the Battle of the Lisaine, Glümer was in command at Montbéliardand and held this unfavorable position against all enemy attacks. For his achievements, Glümer was awarded both classes of the Iron Cross. In addition, he received the Military Karl-Friedrich Merit Order and, on 5 February 1871, the prestigious Pour le Mérite.

After the peace he was appointed commander of the 29th Division in Freiburg im Breisgau, and on 8 March 1873, Glümer became governor of the Metz fortress. Shortly thereafter, on 11 October 1873, he retired and was given the character as General of Infantry.

== Honours and awards ==
- Kingdom of Prussia:
  - Knight of Honour of the Johanniter Order, 1863; Knight of Justice, 1867
  - Commander's Cross of the Royal House Order of Hohenzollern, with Swords, 1866; Grand Commander's Cross with Swords on Ring, 17 June 1880
  - Iron Cross (1870), 2nd and 1st Classes
  - Pour le Mérite (military), 5 February 1871
  - Knight of the Order of the Red Eagle, 1st Class with Oak Leaves and Swords on Ring, 27 March 1873
- Baden: Commander of the Military Karl-Friedrich Merit Order, 1st Class, 28 January 1871

== See also ==
- List of the Pour le Mérite (military class) recipients

== Bibliography ==
- Kurt von Priesdorff: Soldatisches Führertum. Band 7, Hanseatische Verlagsanstalt Hamburg, o. O. [Hamburg], o. J. [1939], DNB-IDN 367632829, S. 438–440, Nr. 2391.
- Bernhard von Poten (1904). "Glümer, Adolf von" . Allgemeine Deutsche Biographie (in German). Vol. 49. Leipzig: Duncker & Humblot. pp. 399–401.
