= Heavy fighter =

Historical class of fighter aircraft; Primarily used in the Pre-War and WWII-period

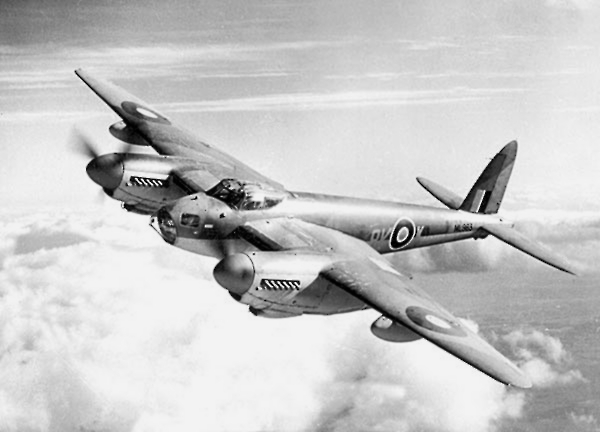
A de Havilland Mosquito FB.VI fighter-bomber used for testing rocket armament

A heavy fighter is a historic category of fighter aircraft produced in the 1930s and 1940s, designed to carry heavier weapons or operate at longer ranges than light fighter aircraft. To achieve performance, most heavy fighters were twin-engined, and many had multi-place crews; this was in contrast to light fighters, which were typically single-engined and single-crew aircraft. In Germany, these larger fighters were known as Zerstörer ("destroyers").

The heavy fighter was a major design class during the pre-World War II period, conceived as long-range escort fighters or heavily armed bomber destroyers. Most such designs failed in this mission, as they could not maneuver quickly enough against single-engine fighters. Most notable among such designs was the Messerschmitt Bf 110, which suffered great losses during the Battle of Britain. An exception was the American Lockheed P-38 Lightning, which proved an effective heavy fighter; even against smaller, lighter, single-engine aircraft and particularly in the Pacific theater.

Many twin-engine heavy fighters found their niche as night fighters, especially in the bomber-destroyer role; or as fighter-bombers, roughly analogous to modern strike fighters. Among such conversions was the Bf 110, which served as a relatively successful night fighter, ground attacker, and fighter-bomber for most of the war; and the Bristol Beaufighter, which emerged as a major anti-shipping strike fighter of the Royal Air Force. Some heavy fighters did find success; the de Havilland Mosquito, simultaneously developed as a light bomber, twin-engine fighter and photo-reconnaissance aircraft, excelled in its originally proposed role as a fast light bomber.

Although not always contemporaneously referred to explicitly as “heavy fighters,” nearly every single combatant of WWII fielded or experimented with twin-engine multi-role combat aircraft.

== Netherlands ==
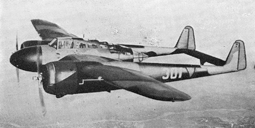
The Fokker G.I in flight

The Fokker G.I was a private venture design by Dutch aircraft manufacturer Fokker in 1936. The G.I was designed to serve on the heavier end of the spectrum of heavy fighters, as a jachtkruiser or a bomber destroyer, and was comparable to early models of the German Messerschmitt Bf 110. The G.I was formidably armed relative even to other early heavy fighters; with twin 23 mm (.91 in) Madsen cannons, and a pair of 7.9 mm (.31 in) Madsen machine guns (later up-armed to eight machine guns) in the nose. For defensive purposes, a single Madsen 7.9 mm machine gun was mounted in a rear-facing turret, manned by the second crew-member.

Prior to the Nazi German invasion of the Netherlands, the G.I was actively involved in air-border patrols in order to ensure neutrality and the integrity of Dutch airspace. On 20 March 1940, a G.I forced down an Armstrong Whitworth Whitley from No. 77 Squadron RAF when it strayed into Dutch air space.

On 10 May 1940, when Nazi Germany invaded, 23 G.I aircraft were serviceable. In the "Five-day War", the available G.I fighters were mainly deployed in ground attack missions, strafing advancing German infantry units, but were also used to attack Junkers Ju 52 transports. Although reports are fragmentary and inaccurate as to the results, G.I fighters were employed over Rotterdam and the Hague, contributing to the loss of 167 Ju 52s, scoring up to 14 confirmed aerial kills. With relentless attacks by the Luftwaffe on Dutch airfields, and overwhelming German air superiority, the G.I suffered heavy losses.

At the conclusion of hostilities, several G.Is were captured by the Germans, and utilized as heavy-fighter trainers for Bf 110 crews at Wiener Neustadt. For the next two years, Flugzeugführerschule (B) 8 flew the G.I until attrition grounded the fleet. On 5 May 1941, a Fokker test pilot, Hidde Leegstra, accompanied by engineer (and member of the Fokker Board of Directors) Dr. Piet Vos, managed to fly a G.I to England from the occupied Netherlands. After landing in England, the G.I was conscripted by Phillips and Powis Aircraft. The company had designed an all-wooden fighter-bomber, and was interested in the G.I wing structure and its resistance to the rigours of a British climate. Despite being left outdoors for the remainder of the war, the G.I survived only to be eventually scrapped after 1945.

There are no surviving G.Is today, although a replica has been built, and is now displayed at the Dutch Nationaal Militair Museum (National Military Museum).

== France ==
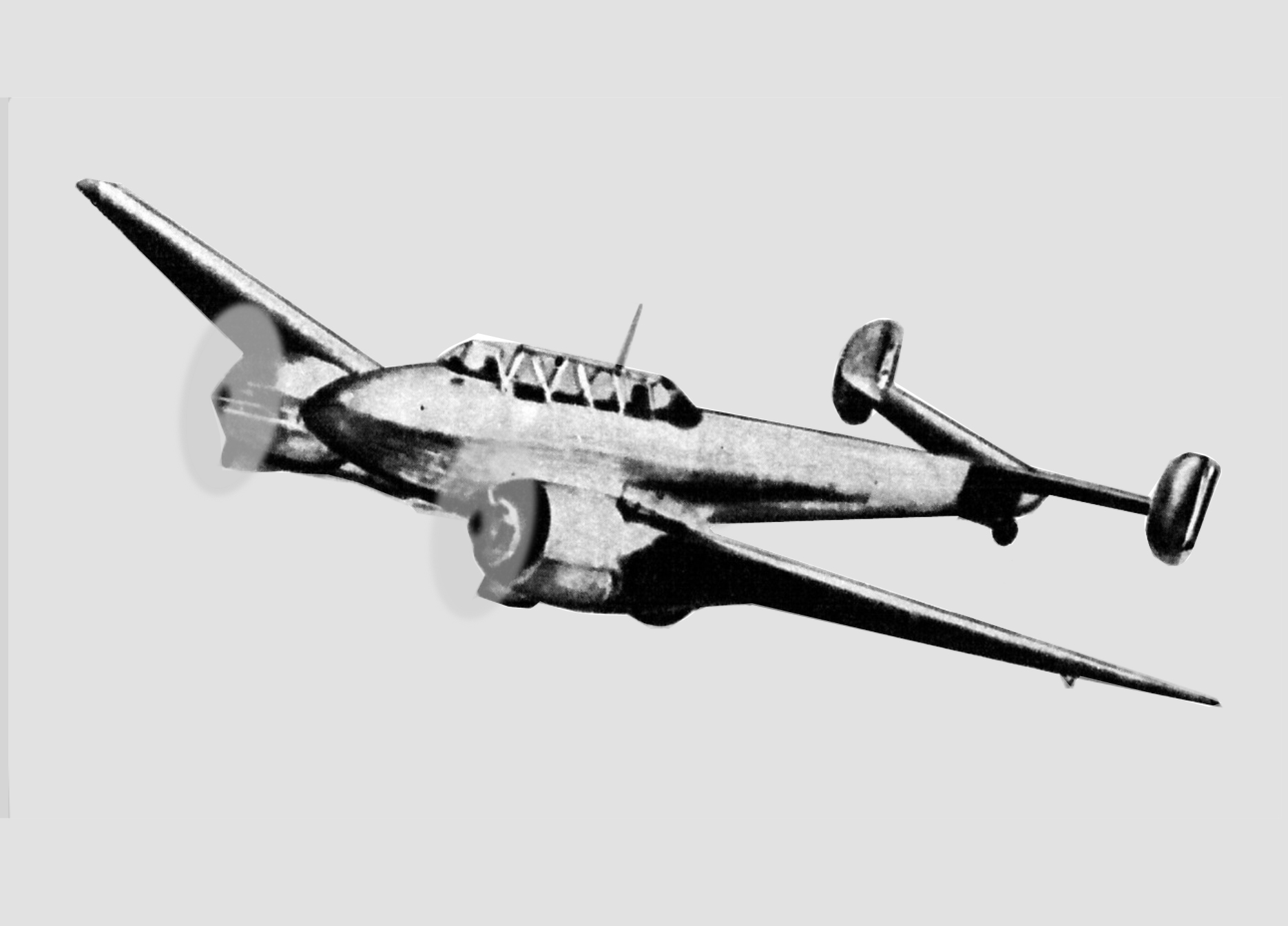
The Potez 633, a light-bomber variant of the 63 series

In 1934, the French Ministry of Air issued a specification for a new two or three-seat multi-role fighter, capable of functioning as a bomber escort and night fighter, as well as providing fighter direction (leading formations of single-engine fighters to their targets). The specification also required, at minimum, two forward-facing 20 mm cannons, as well as a rearward-facing machine gun for defensive purposes. This was relatively very heavy armament for a fighter in 1934, with most contemporary aircraft mounting one or two light machine guns.

In response, French aircraft manufacturer Potez developed the Potez 63 series. The basic design was close to the original specification; that of either a 2 or 3 seat, dual-engine heavy fighter, armed with two 20 mm Hispano-Suiza HS.404 cannons in gondolas under the fuselage and a rearward-facing machine gun for defense. Numerous variants and sub-variants of the 63 series would be designed and produced, including day fighter, night fighter, reconnaissance, and light bomber variants.

While the 63 series was primarily developed for the French Air Force and French Naval Air Arm, they would serve with numerous other nations, both Axis and Allied powers, via either pre-armistice sales by the French government, or via use of captured aircraft.

In French service the series saw action during the Battle of France, and post-armistice within both the Vichy French Armée de l'air de l'Armistice, and the Free French Forces Aériennes Françaises Libres. On 20 May 1940, the light bomber variant, the Potez 633, took part in a ground attack against German troops near Arras. Three 633s took part in the attack. This was the type's only operational mission over France as two days later the 633 was withdrawn from front-line service. The day/night fighter variant, the Potez 631, had quickly proved to be an ineffectual interceptor; it was slower than some German bomber aircraft and 130 km/h (81 mph) slower than the Messerschmitt Bf 109 E-variant fighter. Perhaps the most successful unit operating the Potez 631 was the Flottille F1C of the French Naval Air Arm. Between 10 and 21 May 1940, aircraft of the flottille shot down 12 enemy aircraft in exchange for 8 of their own losses prior to its withdrawal from active combat. The reconnaissance variants, the Potez 637 and 63.11, equipped numerous Groupes de Reconnaissance of the French Air Force, with more than 700 reconnaissance Potez 63.11s having been delivered.

The Potez 63.11 suffered the more losses than any other French type. One factor contributing to the high losses was the near-complete lack of spares, rendering 70 63.11s unserviceable even prior to the German invasion; many aircraft were destroyed on the ground by enemy bombing and strafing attacks, and entire units were wiped out without conducting a single mission.

In addition to the Potez 63 series, another aircraft was developed from the original 1934 heavy fighter specification. This was the Bréguet 690, designed and manufactured originally by Bréguet Aviation. While the Bréguet 690 was not selected to serve as France's primary heavy fighter, the French Air Force's command staff was still intrigued by the sturdy and versatile design. By 1938, with France falling behind in ground-attack/close-air support aircraft, the decision was made by the Air Force to re-designate the Bréguet 690 as the Bréguet 691, and to utilize it as a ground-attack aircraft. The 691's engines proved unreliable in testing, and the decision was made to mount new engines on the design, which was finally designated as the Bréguet 693.

Few 693s were completed before the Nazi German invasion, however, enough were completed to see some action. The 693 made its combat debut on 12 May 1940 when twelve 693s were sent to attack a German mechanized column near Tongeren. Six to eight were shot down by German flak, two more 693s were lost while attempting to return to base, and of those that made it home safely, one was written off (most of the twenty four crewmen survived or were captured alive, although three died during the attack and some of the survivors were badly wounded). As the fighting drew to a close the French attempted to fly as many 693s as possible to North Africa, but only three made the flight, and none were used by the Vichy Air Force in North Africa. In November 1942 with the German occupation of Vichy France, the remaining Bréguets were seized. Some had their engines removed for use in German aircraft, while others were passed on to the Italians, who used them as training aircraft.

== Germany ==
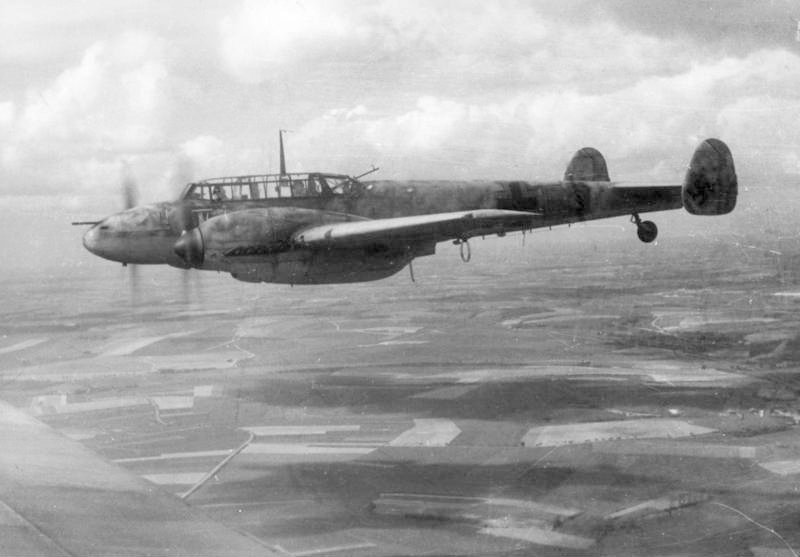
A Messerschmitt Bf 110 in flight

The Messerschmitt Bf 110 was a pre-war German fighter design to meet a RLM specification for a long-ranged fighter. Prior to the war, it was considered by the German Luftwaffe more important than their single-engine fighters. Many of the best pilots were assigned to Bf 110 wings, specifically designated as Zerstörergeschwader ("destroyer squadron", Zerstörer being the same word as used for naval destroyers) wings. While lighter fighters were intended for defense, the destroyers were intended for offensive missions: to escort bombers on missions at long range, then use its superior speed to outrun defending fighters that would be capable of outmaneuvering it.

This doctrine proved to be a costly mistake. In practice the Bf 110 was capable of using this combination of features for only a short time, until the late summer of 1940. It served well against the Hawker Hurricane during the Battle of France, but was easily outperformed by – and up to 50 km/h (31 mph) slower in top speed than – the Supermarine Spitfire during the Battle of Britain. Eventually Bf 110s were converted to interceptors, and were particularly successful in the later marks of the Bf 110G series from 1942 to 1943 onwards as night fighters, serving as the primary aircraft of the Luftwaffe Nachtjagdgeschwader night fighter wings, using various versions of the Lichtenstein radar for nocturnal interception of RAF Bomber Command heavy bombers, as well as finding some use as ground-attack aircraft. The Me 210 and Me 410 Hornisse were all-new aircraft designs meant to replace the Bf 110, but also could not outrun contemporary single-engine fighters, with the Me 210 having serious aerodynamic problems from mistakes in the design of its wing planform and the initial design of its rear fuselage.

Aside from the Bf 110 and Me 210/410, the Luftwaffe also utilized various light bombers, medium bombers, and Schnellbombers (German; literally "fast bomber") in the heavy fighter role. Due to their relatively large size, these were mostly used as night fighter-bomber destroyers, as there was ample room to install airborne intercept radar systems as well as heavy armament. Bombers utilized in such a role included the Junkers Ju 88 and Ju 388; the Heinkel He 219; and the Dornier Do 215 and Do 217.

In addition to light and medium bombers, the Luftwaffe experimented with the concept of a Grosszerstörer ("large destroyer"). Different armament packages were tested on the Heinkel He 177 Greif heavy bomber. Twelve airframes, designated "He 177 A-1/U2", carried twin 30 mm MK 101 cannon in an enlarged ventral gondola and was intended for ground attack, train busting, and possibly long-range anti-shipping raids. They also were intended for use in a bomber destroyer role, intercepting Allied long-range bombers and maritime patrol aircraft threatening the Kriegsmarine's submarines. In the field, a small number of He 177 A-3s were also equipped with the 50 mm Rheinmetall BK-5 cannon in the undernose gondola. This unofficial modification was intended for use in flak-suppression attacks. A never-built A-3/R5 variant was also planned to mount a 75 mm Bordkanone BK 7,5 cm cannon. Five A-5 variants were built, armed with up to 33 spin-stabilized 21 cm (8¼ in) calibre rockets obliquely mounted (firing upwards) in the fuselage, designed to break up and destroy the combat box defensive formations used by USAAF daylight bombers over Germany. Limited operational test flights were conducted with this variant, but they never made contact with the enemy; with the ever-increasing threat of Allied escort fighters, the variant was abandoned.

Towards the end of the war, the Dornier Do 335 Pfeil was developed as a twin-engine dedicated zerstörer (eschewing the usual German wartime practice of assigning multiple roles to heavy fighters), designed with a relatively unique push-pull configuration, which placed its fuselage-mounted twin DB 603 engines' propellers on opposing ends of the fuselage, and potentially allowed much better maneuverability, while essentially using the same engines as the conventional-layout twin-engine Me 410. The centre-line thrust design of the Do 335, the first-ever front-line combat fighter to use it, did allow dramatically higher speeds (just over 750 km/h or 465 mph) than many other twin-piston-engine aircraft of its era, but was never produced in quantity.

Following the example set by the Bf 110, the Japanese built the broadly similar Kawasaki Ki-45 Toryu. Likewise neutral Netherlands built the twin-boom Fokker G.I, only to be seized by the Luftwaffe after the German invasion of the Netherlands.

== United Kingdom ==
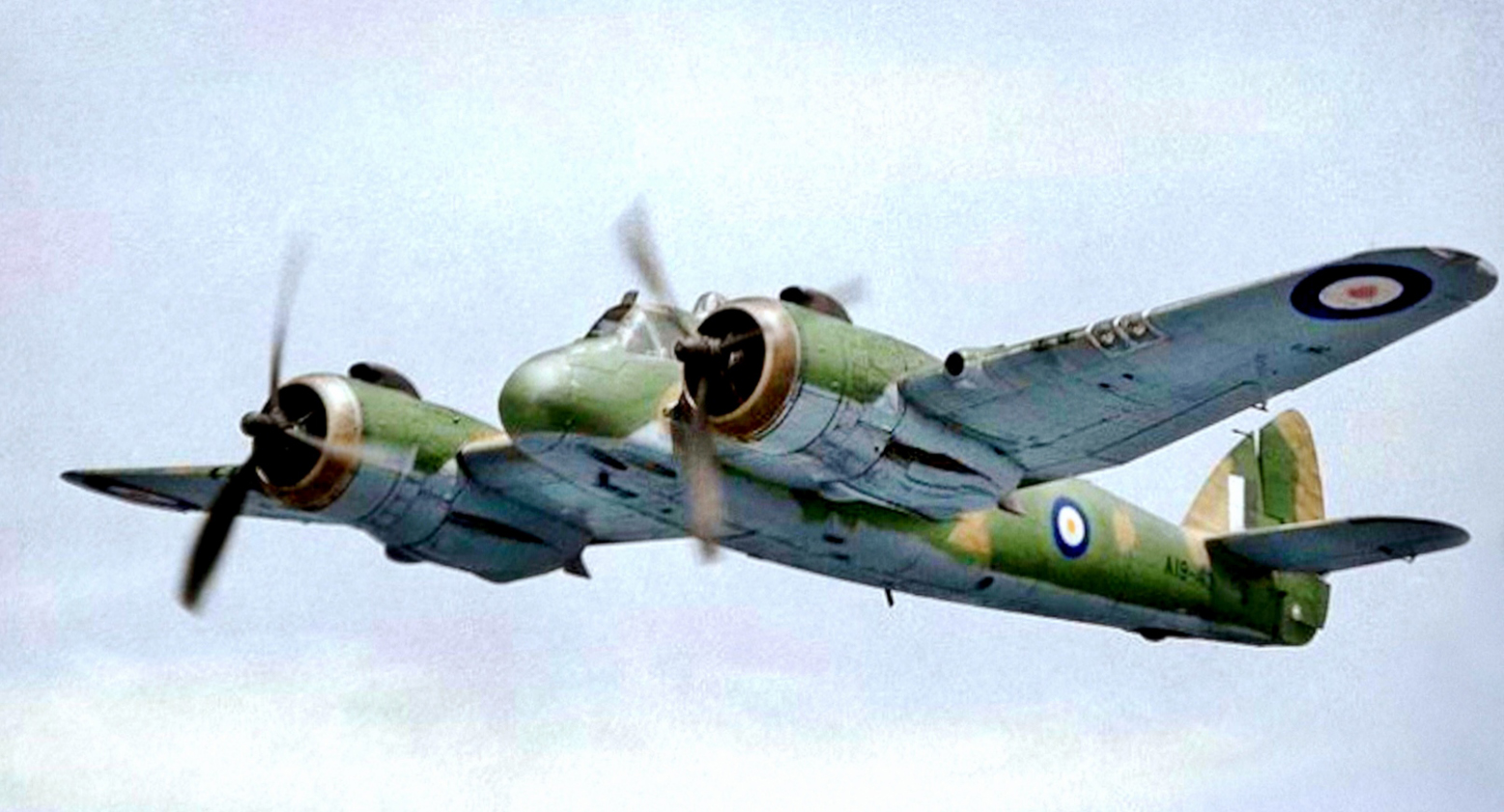
Bristol Beaufighter

Before the war the British sought two types of twin-engined fighters, with turret-mounted and nose-mounted (cannon) armament respectively. The former because it was expected to give greater opportunity for attack at higher speeds compared to the biplane era; the latter because of loss of accuracy expected with heavy weapons installed in wings. One example of an aircraft to meet the latter was the Gloster F.9/37; later development into a night-fighter was curtailed in 1941 so that Gloster's design team could concentrate on British jet fighter projects. The limitations of pure turret fighters (though the single engine Boulton Paul Defiant was successfully adapted as a nightfighter) and aerodynamics of multiple cannon installations in turrets (such as Boulton Paul P.92) curtailed introduction of designs into service.

Perhaps in the belief that "The bomber will always get through", Britain lagged behind in heavy fighter development. Apart from the Westland Whirlwind and the high-altitude Welkin, both built only in modest numbers (the former due to lack of engines, the latter due to changed requirement), the Royal Air Force's wartime twin-engined fighters were all adapted from contemporary light bombers. During the German advance through the Netherlands, Belgium and into France, squadrons using Bristol Blenheim 1Fs, fitted with a ventral gun pack and operating as long range fighters, suffered heavy losses, and were withdrawn from daylight operations. As the Battle of Britain commenced, some of these Blenheims were then equipped with radar, operating as night fighters.

More successful was the Bristol Beaufighter, started in 1938 as an interim aircraft to cover for delays in introduction of a cannon-armed fighter (the Westland Whirlwind). The Beaufighter design reused major portions of the earlier Beaufort torpedo bomber. Armed with six .303 inch (7.7 mm) machine guns, four 20 mm cannon and rockets, bombs or torpedoes, the Beaufighter was potent in the anti-ship and ground attack role in the Pacific and Europe. With the addition of radar, it was one of the Royal Air Force's main night fighters. Similarly, the successful de Havilland Mosquito fast bomber was simultaneously adapted for both day and night fighter use. A parallel single-seat twin Merlin engine fighter the de Havilland Hornet entered service in the immediate post-war period and served until 1955.

When there appeared to be a threat from German high-altitude bombers, the Westland Welkin was developed. This was a twin engine design with wide wings (70 ft (21 m)) to be able to intercept at 45,000 ft (14,000 m). The threat never materialised and Welkins did not see combat service. A contemporary design the six cannon armed Vickers Type 432, which itself descended from a requirement for a fighter with 40mm cannon, got no further than the prototype.

Due to the different requirements for naval fighter aircraft, the British put into service some heavyweight single-engine fighters such as the Fairey Firefly.

== United States ==
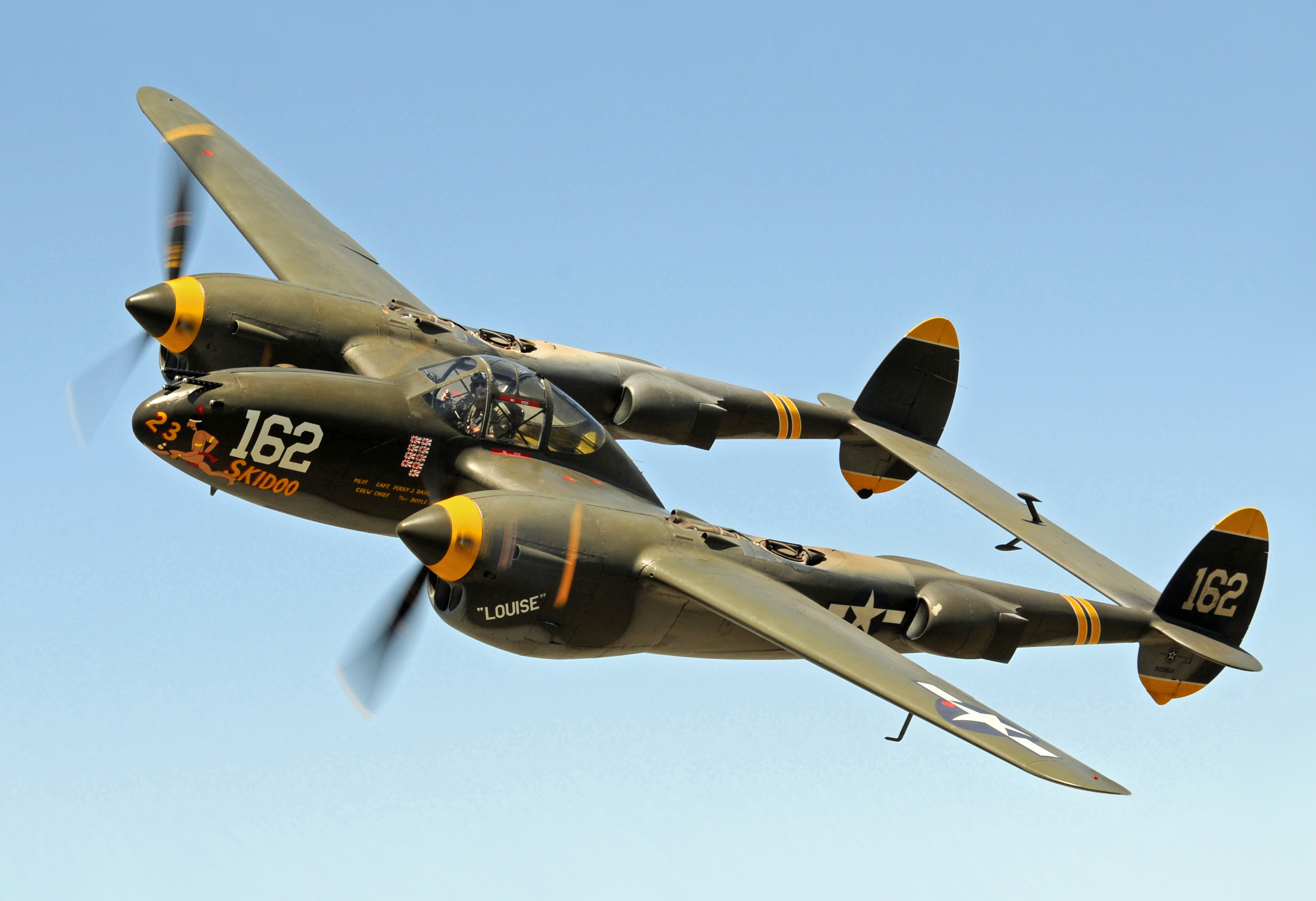
The Lockheed P-38 Lightning

The US military never officially designated an aircraft as a "heavy fighter," but from the 1930s through to the immediate post-WWII period there were a slew of American designs that were twin-engined, relatively heavy in weight, and designed in line with other nations’ heavy fighter philosophy.

During the late 1930s, Bell Aircraft of the United States designed the YFM-1 Airacuda "bomber destroyer". The design was heavily armed, particularly for a pre-WWII design, mounting two 37 mm (1.46 in) M4 cannons as her primary armament along with two .30 in (7.62 mm) M1919 Browning machine guns and two .50 in (12.7 mm) M2 Browning heavy machine guns for defense. A very large and unique airframe, the Airacuda was plagued with design flaws; only 13 prototypes were built, none of which participated in World War II.

The US would enter WWII with one of the most effective heavy fighters in history, the Lockheed P-38 Lightning. It was ostensibly designed as a twin-engine bomber interceptor to climb quickly and carry heavy armament at high speed, with the lighter Bell P-39 Airacobra meeting the single-engine version of the same requirement. An advanced design crewed by a lone pilot, the P-38 performed best in the Pacific theater where its long-range proved a pivotal advantage. This range allowed a team of sixteen early P-38 models to intercept and kill Japanese Admiral Isoroku Yamamoto while he was traveling aboard a transport aircraft. The P-38 proved adaptable enough to undertake multiple roles including escort fighter, reconnaissance (as the F-4 and F-5 variants of which over 1,200 were built), night fighter (as the radar-equipped P-38M variant), and as a fighter-bomber. In the escort fighter role, the P-38 accompanied Boeing B-17 Flying Fortress raids deep into German-held Europe. The P-38 and the much lighter North American P-51 Mustang were the first two American fighters over Berlin in March 1944.

The only other American heavy fighter to serve in great numbers during WWII was the Northrop P-61 Black Widow, which was also the United States’ first dedicated night fighter, in addition to being the first aircraft designed to utilize radar. Armed with four forward-firing 20 mm (.79 in) AN/M2 cannons mounted in the lower fuselage and four .50 caliber (12.7 mm) Browning AN/M2 machine guns mounted in a remote-controlled dorsal gun turret (capable of firing forward as well as rearward for defense), it was one of the most heavily armed aircraft in American service during the WWII-period. The P-61 was unofficially credited with the last Allied air victory before VJ Day. The P-61 was also modified to create the unarmed F-15 Reporter, a specialized photo-reconnaissance aircraft for the United States Army Air Forces and subsequently used by the United States Air Force. The F-15 Reporter was the last piston-powered photo-reconnaissance aircraft designed and produced for the United States Air Force. The Reporter was also responsible for producing most of the aerial reconnaissance photographs of North Korea during the Korean War. The P-61—redesignated as the F-61 in June 1948—would also serve as a night/all-weather interceptor with the USAF's Air Defense Command (ADC) until 1951.

In 1945, with the large-scale use of jet aircraft becoming commonplace, the United States Army Air Forces put forward technical specifications to the US aerospace industry, requesting both day and night interceptors. While the night interceptor technical specification did not specifically require jet power, it did place a minimum speed requirement of 503 mph (810 km/h) on the project, effectively necessitating jet power. By 1946, two aircraft were chosen by the USAAF to compete for the contract; the Curtiss-Wright XP-87 Blackhawk and the Northrop XP-89 Scorpion. While the XP-89 would eventually emerge as the winner, due to multiple issues with both competing aircraft, the first Scorpions would not reach operational Air Defense Command interceptor units until 1951. With no other night interceptors to call on from 1945 to 1951, the P-61 Black Widow was charged with protecting American airspace from the growing threat of Soviet strategic bombers. The P-61 would be re-designated as the F-61 in 1948. With F-61s no longer in production post-war, they were usually replaced with the newer F-82 Twin Mustang once they became unserviceable.

The F-82 Twin Mustang was America's last heavy fighter design as well as being the last American piston-engined fighter ordered into production by the United States. The Twin Mustang, while appearing to be simply a ‘twinned’ P-51 Mustang, actually only shared less than 20% commonality of parts with the original Mustang. Initially intended as a long-range escort fighter for Boeing B-29 Superfortress strategic bombers attacking the Japanese home islands, it would become operational only after the Japanese surrender. Originally designed in 1943, it was officially accepted into USAAF service in August 1945. The design carried six .50 in (12.7 mm) heavy machine guns (HMGs) on the ‘center’ wing, between each fuselage, with three on each outboard wing as on the original Mustang design. The HMGs were also AN/M3s instead of the original Mustang's AN/M2 HMGs. The AN/M3 increased the rate of fire to around 1,200-1,300 rounds per minute (firing the same round with minimal change in weight or size) compared to the AN/M2's 750-850 rounds per minute, a roughly 60% increase in rounds per minute. The first XP-82 prototype was equipped with a removable centerline gun pod housing eight additional .50 caliber M3 Brownings, but this did not feature on production aircraft. A separate centerline gun pod containing a 40 mm (1.6 in) cannon was considered, but was never built. The outer wings were reinforced to allow the addition of hard points for carrying additional fuel or 1,000 lb (450 kg) of ordnance. The F-82E was the first operational model and its initial operational assignment was to the Strategic Air Command 27th Fighter Wing (later re-designated the 27th Fighter-Escort Wing, or 27th FEW) at Kearney Air Force Base, Nebraska in March 1948. With no long-range jet fighters to escort the strategic bomber force, the 27th FEW was to fly these missions in F-82Es.

During the start of the Korean War, the F-82 replaced the F-61 Black Widow as the USAF's night interceptor in the Far East Air Forces. The Twin Mustang was utilized in the night fighter-interceptor and fighter-bomber role early in the war, and it scored the first US aerial victory, with Lt. William G. "Skeeter" Hudson, USAF, scoring a Yak-11 kill. The Twin Mustang was increasingly out-classed by jet aircraft, and was eventually replaced in Korea by Republic F-84 Thunderjets and North American F-86 Sabres.

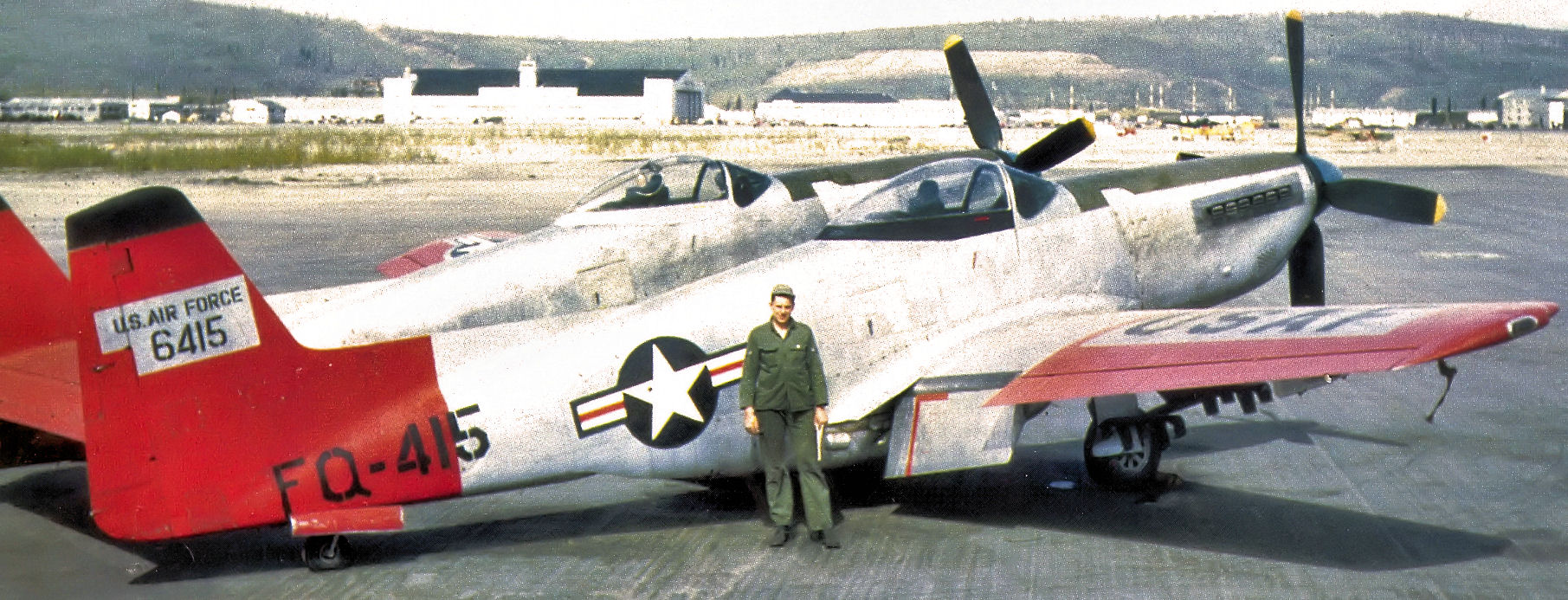
USAF operational F-82 Twin Mustang, F-82F on the ramp at Ladd AFB, just before going to salvage at Elmendorf AFB, May 1953.

The F-82 would end its life as the last operational American piston-engined interceptor. Primarily stationed in Alaska out of Adak Island (and later out of Ladd Air Force Base) as part of the 449th Fighter (All-Weather) Squadron (F(AW)S), a winterized variant, known as the F-82H was developed specifically for this task. The winterized Twin Mustang would perform long-range aerial patrols over the extremes of American airspace around Alaska, with the area being viewed as a possible ‘back door’ for Soviet strategic bombers. The F-82H was slowly supplemented by the Lockheed F-94 Starfire all-weather interceptor, and by 1953, it had completely replaced the Twin Mustang.

Apart from the P-38 and P-61, other mid-WWII projects included the proposed Curtis XP-71. It was an exceptionally large heavy fighter, intended to serve as a long-range escort fighter and bomber destroyer. Its design was based around a 75 mm cannon capable of destroying large heavy bombers with one hit, but interest in the project waned and the 83 ft (25 m)-wingspan aircraft did not progress beyond a single mockup. Another bomber destroyer was the Beechcraft Model 28, also bearing a 75 mm cannon, with twin turrets mounting .50 in (12.7 mm) Browning AN/M2 heavy machine guns for defence. The design was re-designated the XA-38 Grizzly and was repurposed as a ground attack aircraft intended to be able to defeat enemy tanks and ground fortifications with its heavy cannon. However, for reasons including need of the chosen powerplant for B-29 bombers it did not enter service.

Post-war, the Grumman F7F Tigercat was the first twin-engine fighter aircraft to enter service with the United States Navy, using two Pratt & Whitney Double Wasp radial engines, achieving a top speed of 460 mph (740 km/h). It was among the fastest piston-engine aircraft ever built, and heavily armed with four 20mm M2 cannon and four 0.50 in (12.7 mm) Browning AN/M2 heavy machine guns, with hard points for bombs or a torpedo. Although Grumman designed and developed the aircraft during World War II, it entered service too late to see action before VJ Day. It served in the Korean War and retired in 1954.

== USSR ==
During the interwar period the USSR set about developing heavily armed twin-engine fighters to function in the heavy-fighter role, particularly as interceptors and bomber destroyers. Uniquely, the Soviets experimented with recoilless rifles as primary armament, but abandoned the effort as impractical in the late 1930s. Twin-engine designs such as the Tupolev ANT-29 or Petlyakov VI-100 were proposed, but never made it past the prototype stage, and the USSR entered World War II without a viable heavy fighter.

With the German invasion of the Soviet Union in 1941, the Soviet Air Forces were caught off-guard; with only lighter, single-engined, relatively lightly armed fighters to intercept Luftwaffe bombers, and no dedicated night fighters (a role typically filled by heavy fighters). After the German night bombing raids of Moscow in 1941, the People's Commissariat of Defense of the Soviet Union (NKO) sought to rapidly correct this deficiency. In order to create a fighter that would fill the needed specifications quickly, it was determined that it would utilize a pre-existing airframe. The NKO selected the Petlyakov Pe-2 – a twin-engined light bomber – to be modified, and within 4 days the newly minted Petlyakov Pe-3 took flight.

Numerous issues were identified with the Pe-3, primarily stemming from the added gun and cannon armament. Various improvements, workarounds, and modifications were tested to address these issues. The aircraft was placed under further scrutiny when it was issued on a trial-basis to the 95th High-Speed Bomber Regiment within the Moscow Military District in late 1941. The Regiment's experiences revealed further deficiencies not found during initial testing; Firing the aircraft's forward-facing armament at night temporarily blinded the pilots, crews complained about a lack of frontal armor, and heavier armament in general was requested. Ground crews would rectify two of these issues on their own; flash-hiders were installed on the forward armament, and RS-82 and RS-132 rocket launchers were sometimes mounted for ground-attack missions, while a DAG-10 aerial grenade launcher was occasionally mounted in the tail.

Most of the problems found during trials and operational field-testing would be rectified by the Petlyakov Design Bureau with the introduction of the Pe-3bis (Pe-3 'Improved'). Pe-3bis production began in April 1942, although 207 standard Pe-3s were produced in the intervening months. However, additional issues were again discovered with the Pe-3bis, and in May 1942 the Petlyakov Design Bureau switched production over to a Pe-3bis with further minor modifications; no name or designation change was made.

A reconnaissance variant, with an onboard camera system and greater range was also produced in small numbers; This variant was often referred to as either the Pe-3R or Pe-3F.

The Pe-3 and Pe-3bis would serve as the only widely fielded heavy fighter of the Soviet Air Forces during WWII. Other heavy fighter designs; such as the Grushin Gr-1, Mikoyan-Gurevich DIS, Polikarpov TIS, and the Tairov Ta-3; were proposed, but never moved beyond test stages.

== Post-World War II ==
Like other military types, piston-engine heavy fighters such as the de Havilland Hornet and Sea Hornet, as well as the North American F-82 Twin Mustang continued in service in the years immediately after the war. All were developed at the end of World War II for use in the Pacific theatre, though none reached operational squadrons until after VJ day, the Hornet in 1946, the Sea Hornet in 1947 and the Twin Mustang in 1948.

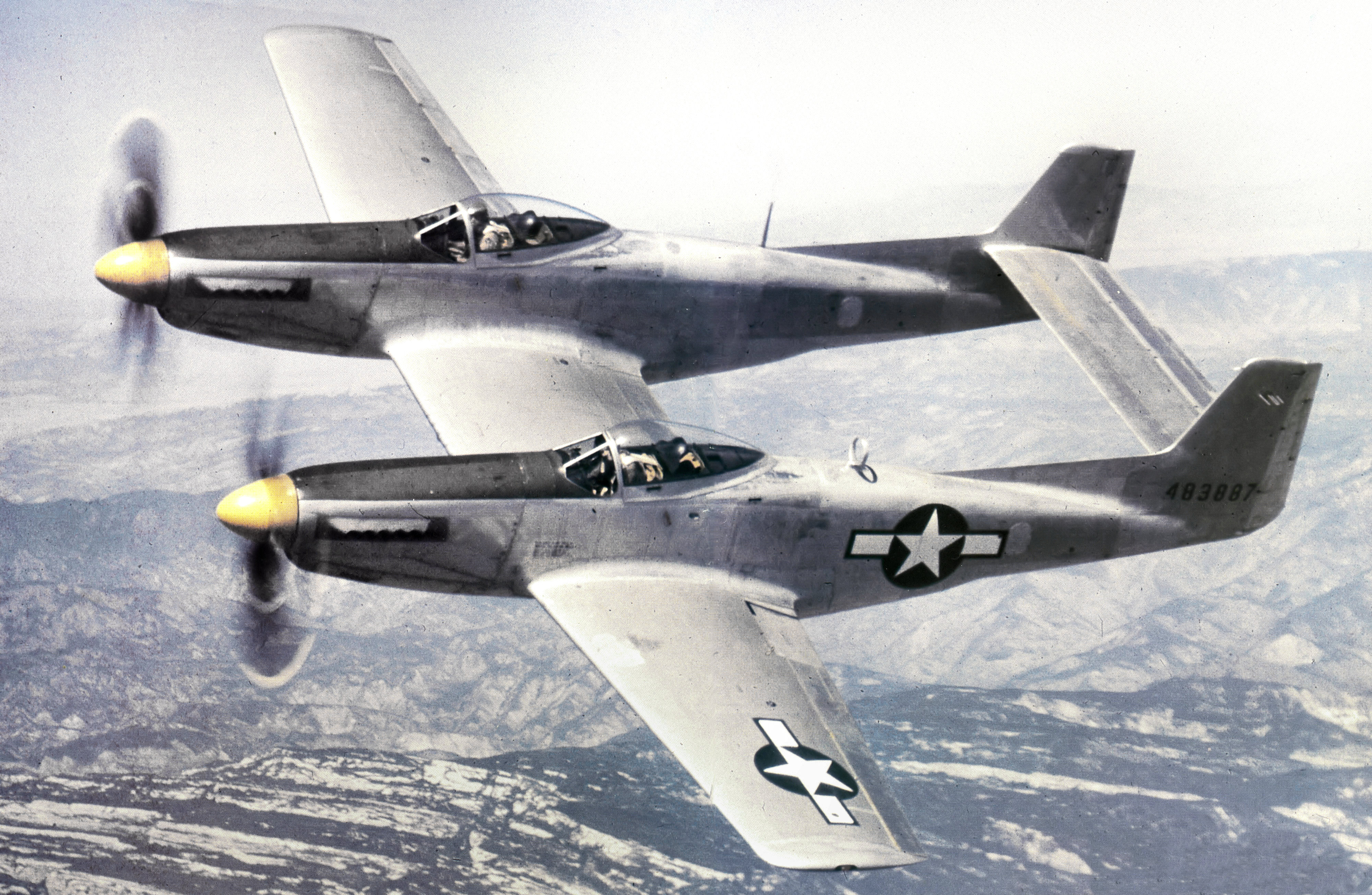
The XP-82 prototype of the F-82 Twin Mustang.

4th-generation and 5th-generation air superiority fighters are designed to wrest air superiority from the enemy in hostile territory, and thus usually have greater range than tactical fighters or interceptors. They therefore typically have two engines, and often carry a larger number of air-to-air missiles than their smaller brethren. They typically also have more capable and complex radar and electronic systems, with the result that in older air-superiority fighters such as the McDonnell Douglas F-4 Phantom II or Grumman F-14 Tomcat, a second dedicated crew member was carried to manage radar and weapon-systems.

== See also ==
- Bomber destroyer
- Interceptor aircraft
- Light fighter
- Night fighter
