= 100th Mechanized Brigade =

Ukrainian Ground Forces unit

- 100 окрема механізована бригада 100 okrema mekhanizovana bryhada
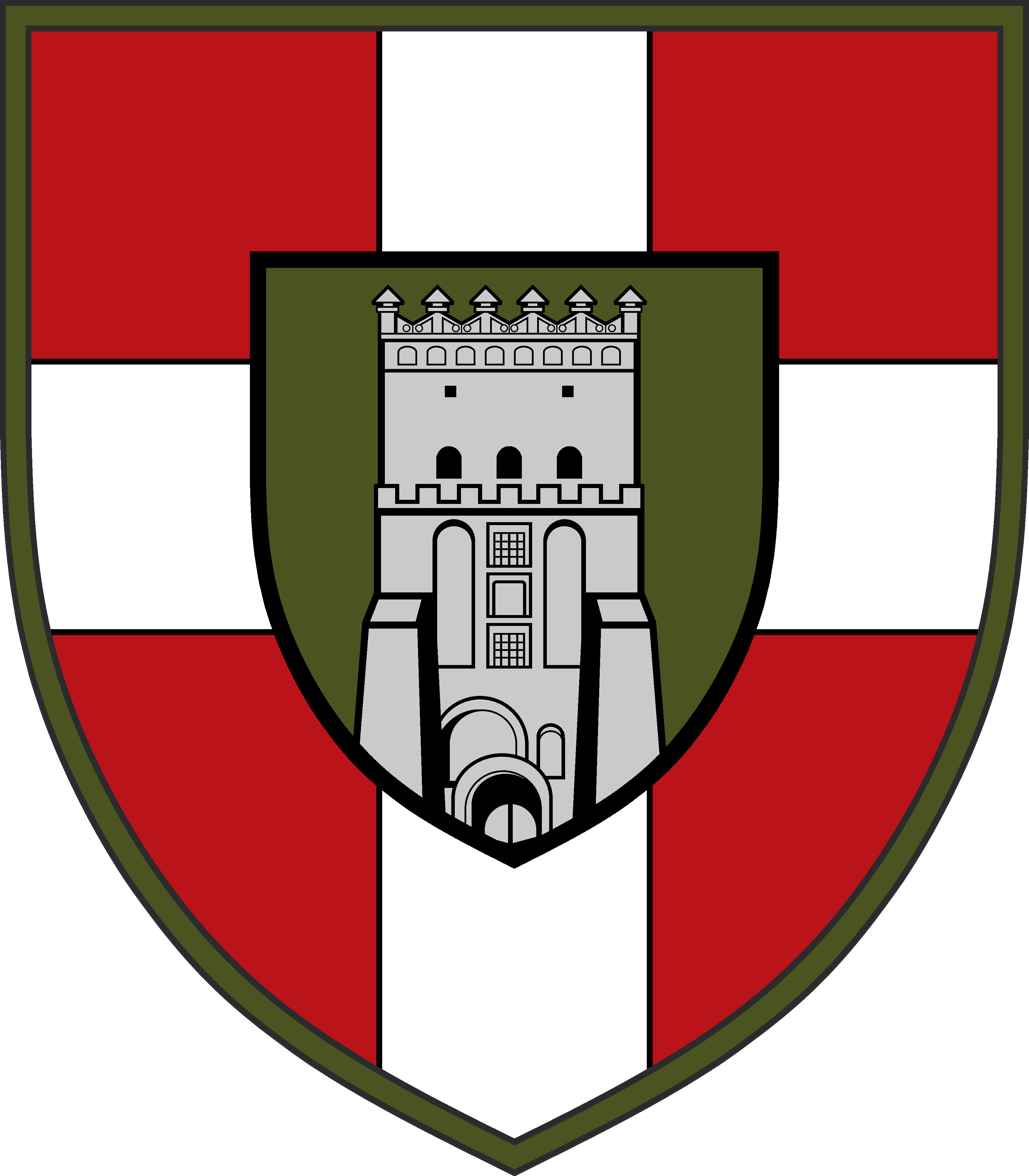
- Shoulder sleeve insignia
- Active: 27 June 2018 – present
- Country: Ukraine
- Branch: Ukrainian Ground Forces
- Role: Mechanized Infantry
- Size: 2,000 (April 2024)
- Part of: 9th Army Corps
- Garrison/HQ: Lutsk, Volyn Oblast
- Engagements: Russo-Ukrainian war; Russian invasion of Ukraine; Eastern Ukraine campaign; Battle of Bilohorivka; Battle of Bakhmut; Luhansk Oblast campaign; Battle of Ocheretyne; Battle of Toretsk
- Website: Official Facebook page

Commanders
- Current commander: Colonel Ruslan Tkachuk (2022 - present)
- Notable commanders: Colonel Kucher Oleksandr (2018 - 2020)

Insignia
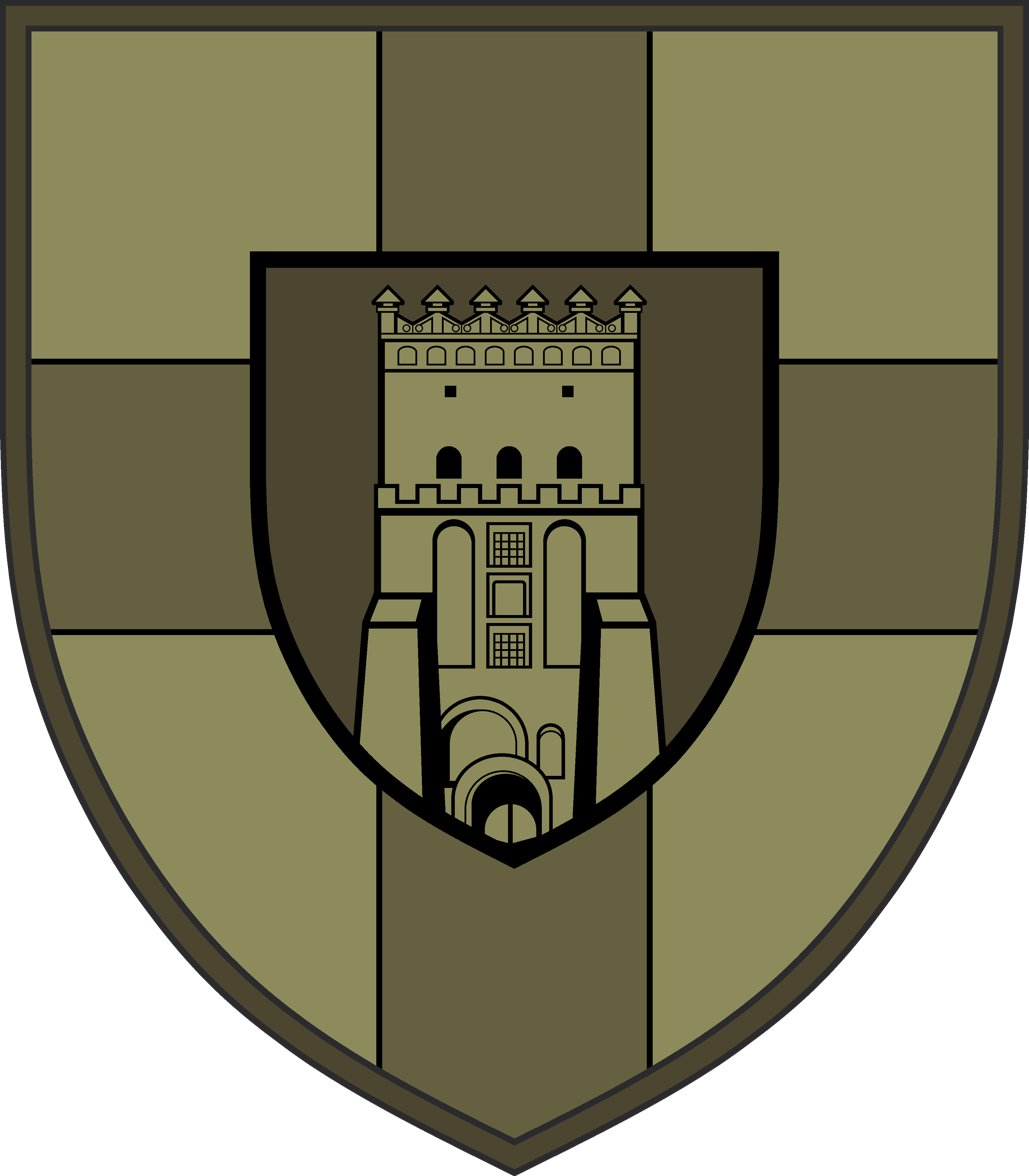
- Field insignia

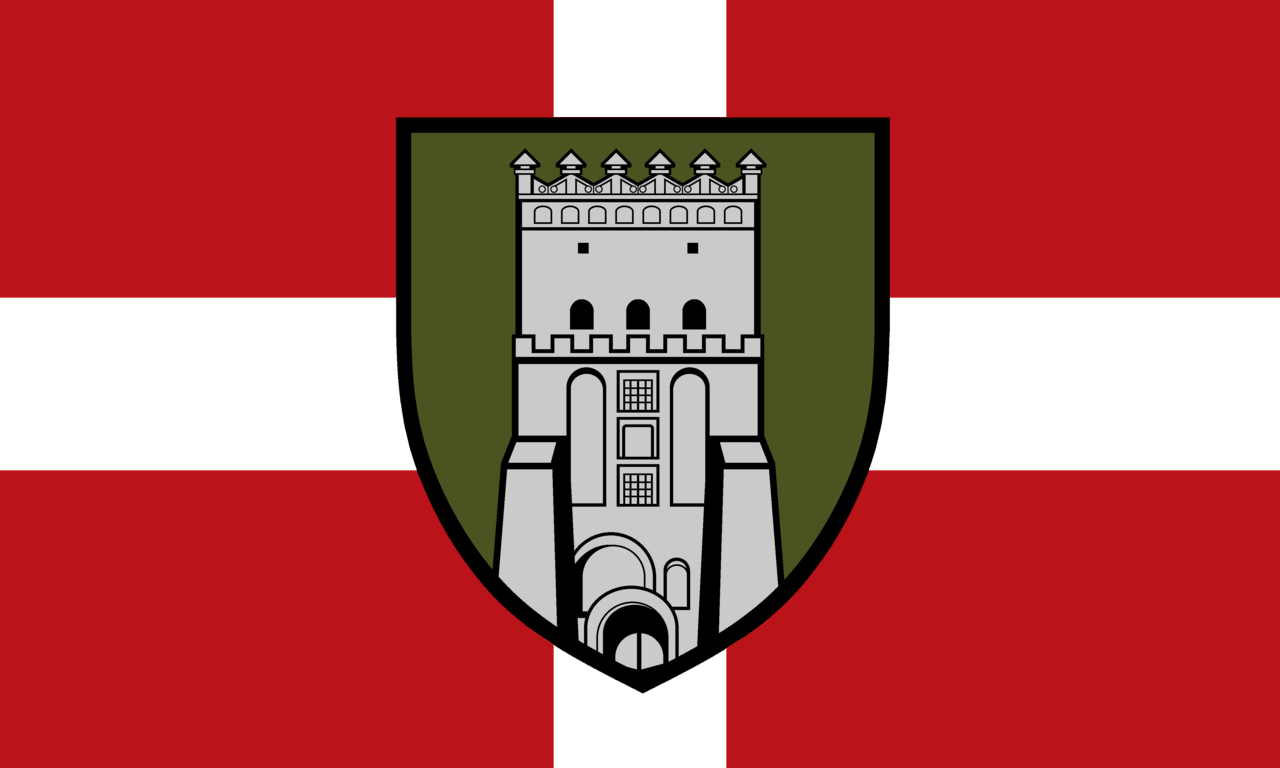
- Flag

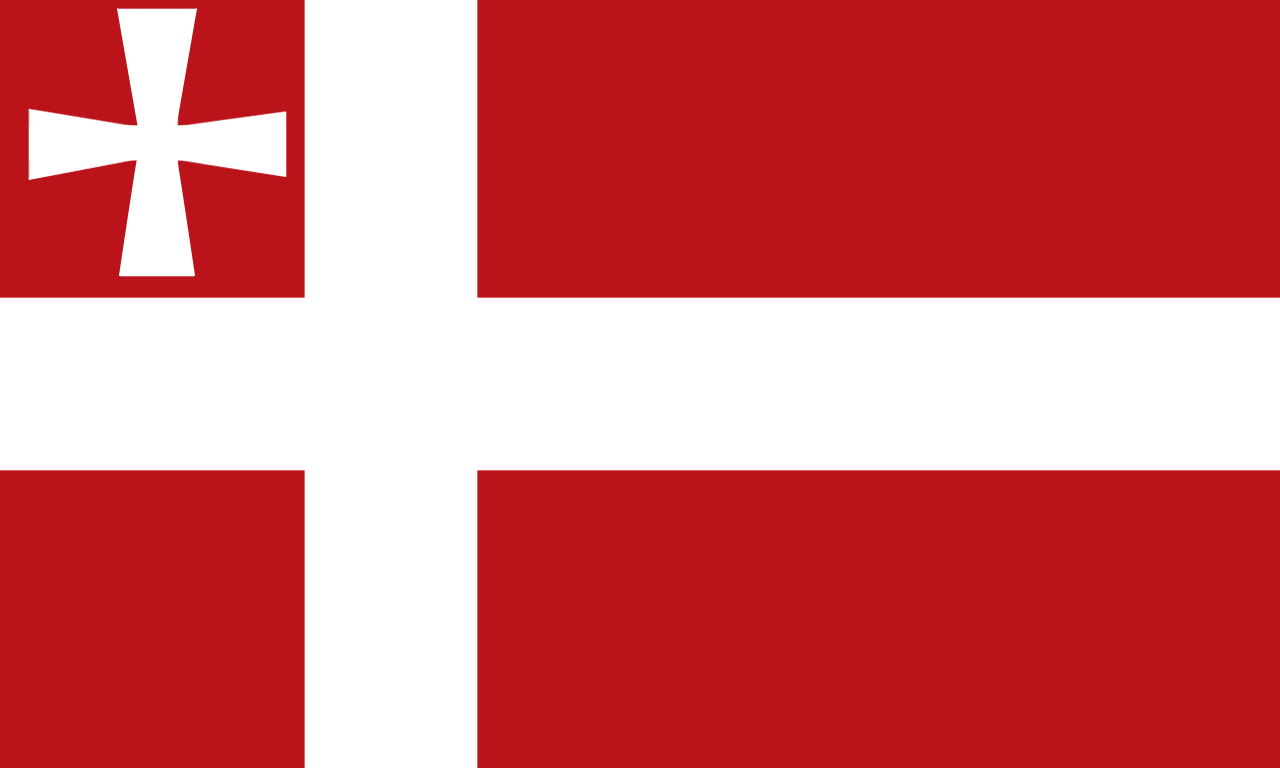
- Former flag

The 100th Mechanized Brigade (Ukrainian: 100 окрема механізована бригада, romanized: 100 okrema mekhanizovana bryhada), formerly the 100th Territorial Defense Brigade, is a formation of the Ukrainian Ground Forces formed on 27 June 2018. The brigade was a former Territorial Defense Brigade until being reformed in late March 2024 as a Mechanized Brigade.

== History ==
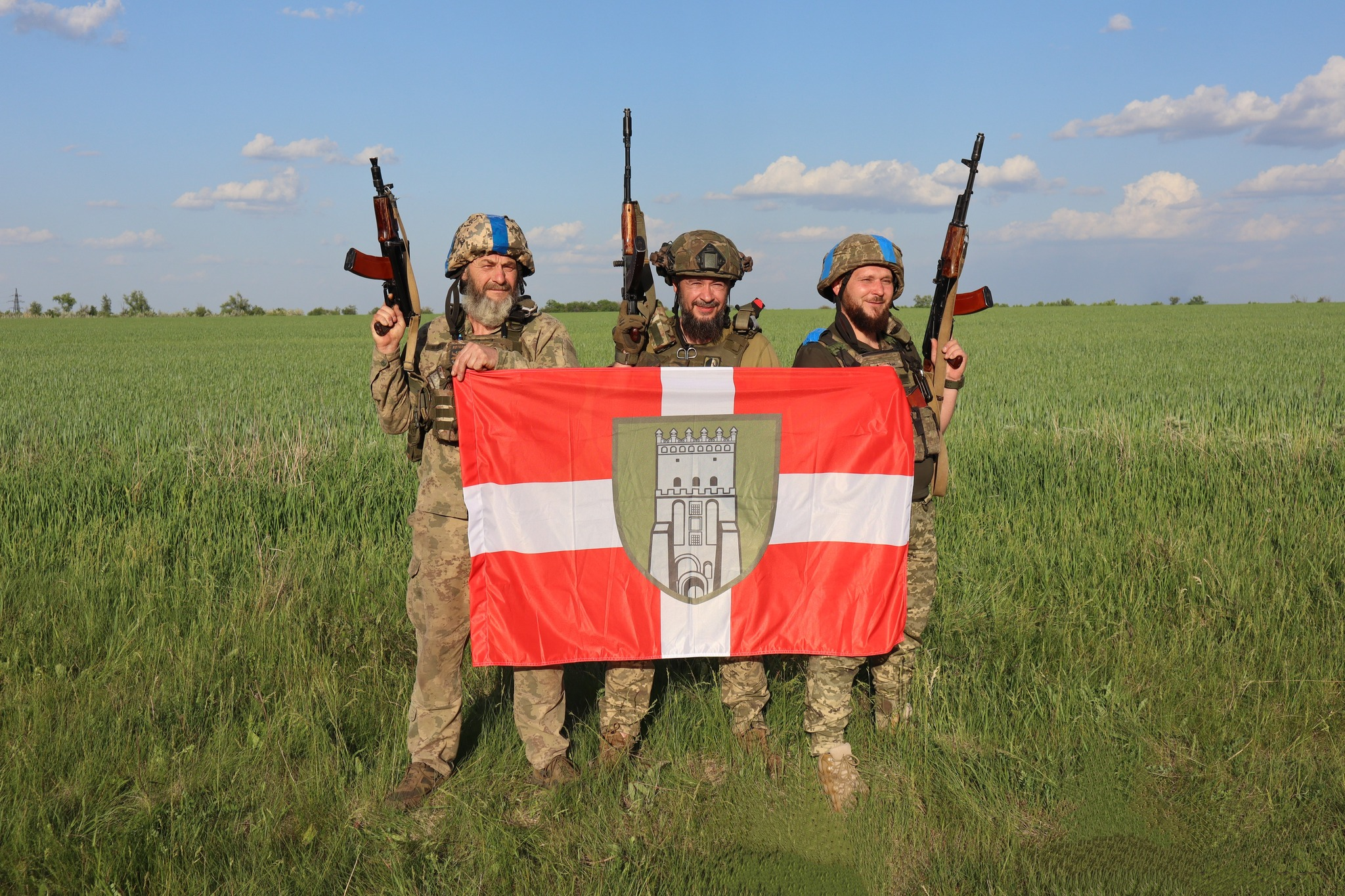
Soldiers of the brigade with its standard.

=== Formation ===
In 2018, the brigade, known as the 100th Separate Brigade of the Territorial Defense Forces (Ukrainian: 100-та окрема бригада територіальної оборони, romanized: 100-ta okrema bryhada teritorialʹnoï oboroni), was formed in Volyn Oblast in order to serve as a defense unit for the area. According to the Ukrainian Territorial Defense Forces, it was an important part of the Defense Forces, and helped to defend the country's independence.

=== Reforms ===
It was announced on 30 March 2024, by the brigade's press service, that the brigade was being reorganised under the designation of the 100th Mechanized Brigade, being transferred to the Ground Forces component rather than the Territorial Defense Forces. The brigade was only reformed on the basis of the existing units of the 100th Territorial Defense Brigade. Alongside this, the brigade received a new insignia, shifting away from the Territorial Defense Forces styled insignia, opting for the middle of the insignia to have a shield embedded with a fortified tower in the centre.

=== Insignia ===
According to the Territorial Defense Forces of Ukraine, the insignia of the brigade reflected the pride and courage of the defenders of Volyn. The sleeve insignia had the appearance of a red heraldic shield with a blue serrated head and decored with blue edging. The centre of the insignia was embdedded with a silver Latin cross on a red shield. It was mentioned that the red symbolises the bravery, courage and willingness to give one's life for "God and the Motherland", and white represents "purity and integrity".

After the brigade was reformed into a mechanized brigade on 30 March 2024, the insignia of the brigade changed to have a fortified castle tower displayed in the centre of the insignia with a subdued green in the background—the tower being a direct reference to a tower of Lubart's Castle in Lutsk, Volyn Oblast. The rest of the shield retained the silver Latin cross on a red shield and was accompanied by a black border. Later the same day, the insignia was changed for the a second time to have a similar appearance, but instead the centre of the insignia had a light blue colour behind the fortified castle tower, followed by a strikingly different and more purple colour on the borders of the insignia; this variant would remain in use until 25 April 2024 where it would be changed to its current state.

On 25 April 2024, the insignia of the brigade changed for a final time where the design of the Lubart Castle tower was made to be grey rather than a toned and subdued golden/yellow colour, along with the background colour of the tower being returned to the first design on 30 March 2024, being a subdued green. In addition to this, the interior shield in the middle of the insignia had its border colours returned to black, alongside the rest of the shield having a more subdued green border. The insignia still retains the core areas of the insignia, such as the Latin silver cross.

==== Visual insignia ====
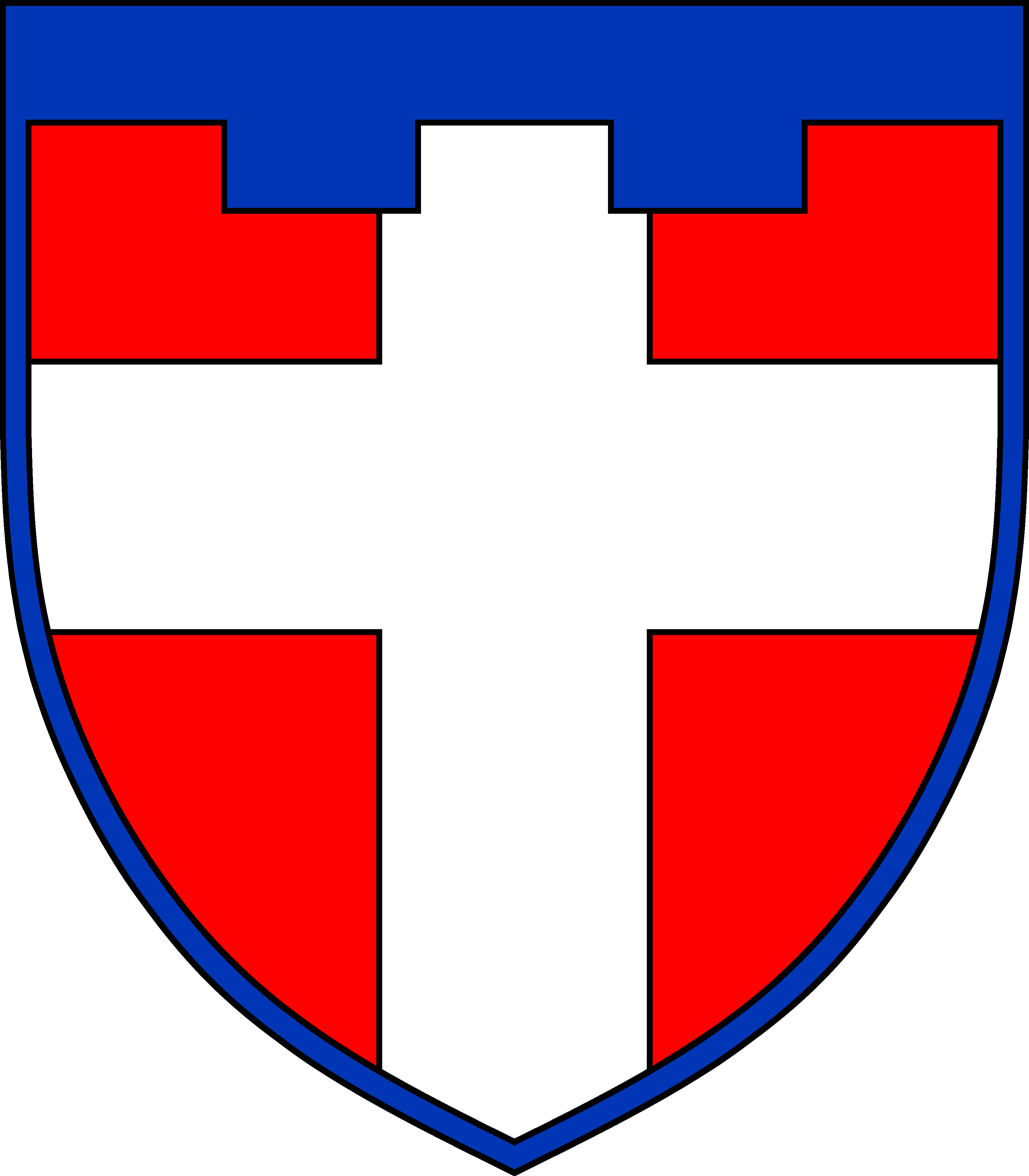
Former shoulder sleeve insignia of the 100th Territorial Defense Brigade.

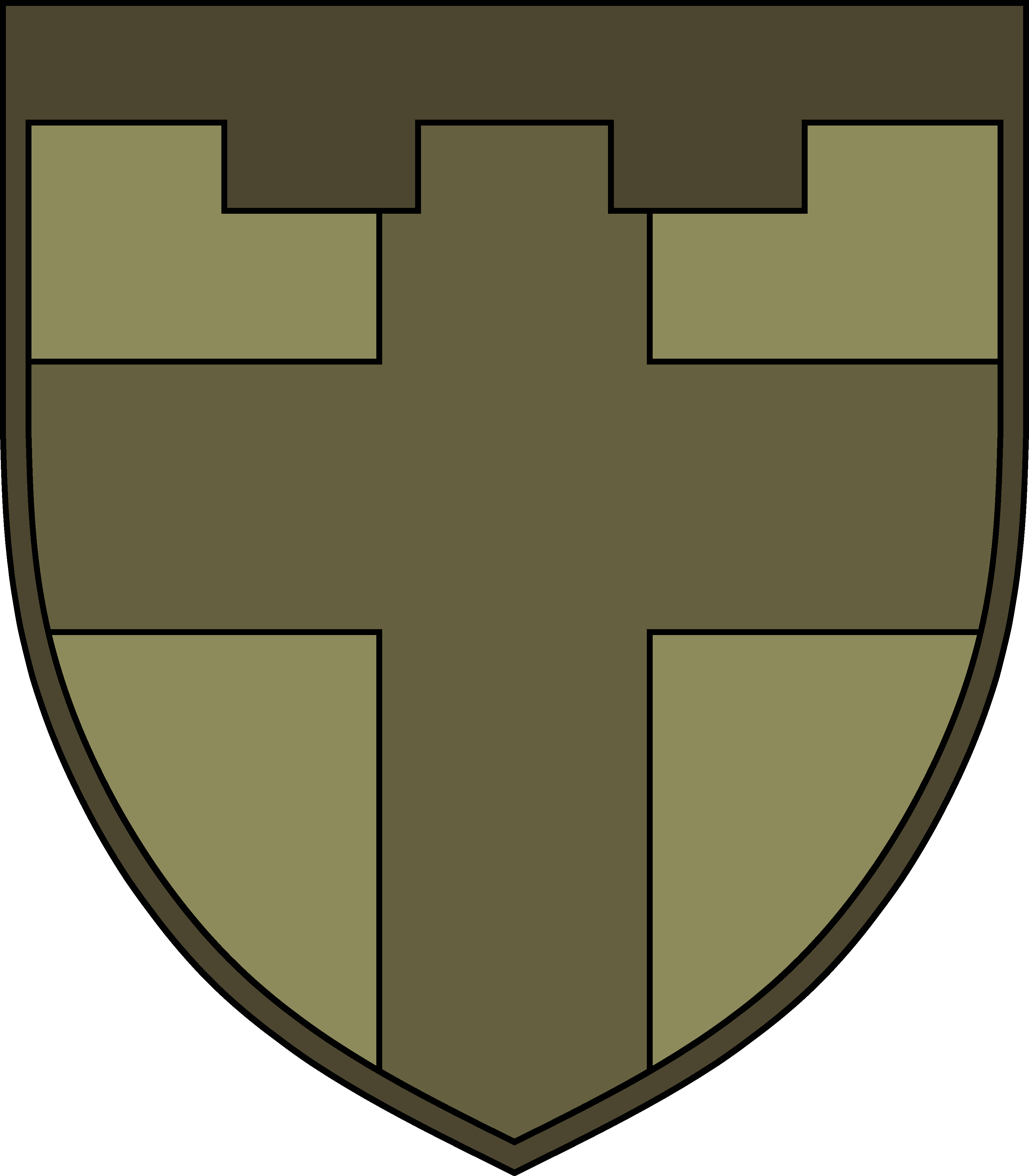
Former shoulder sleeve insignia, subdued variant, of the 100th Territorial Defense Brigade.

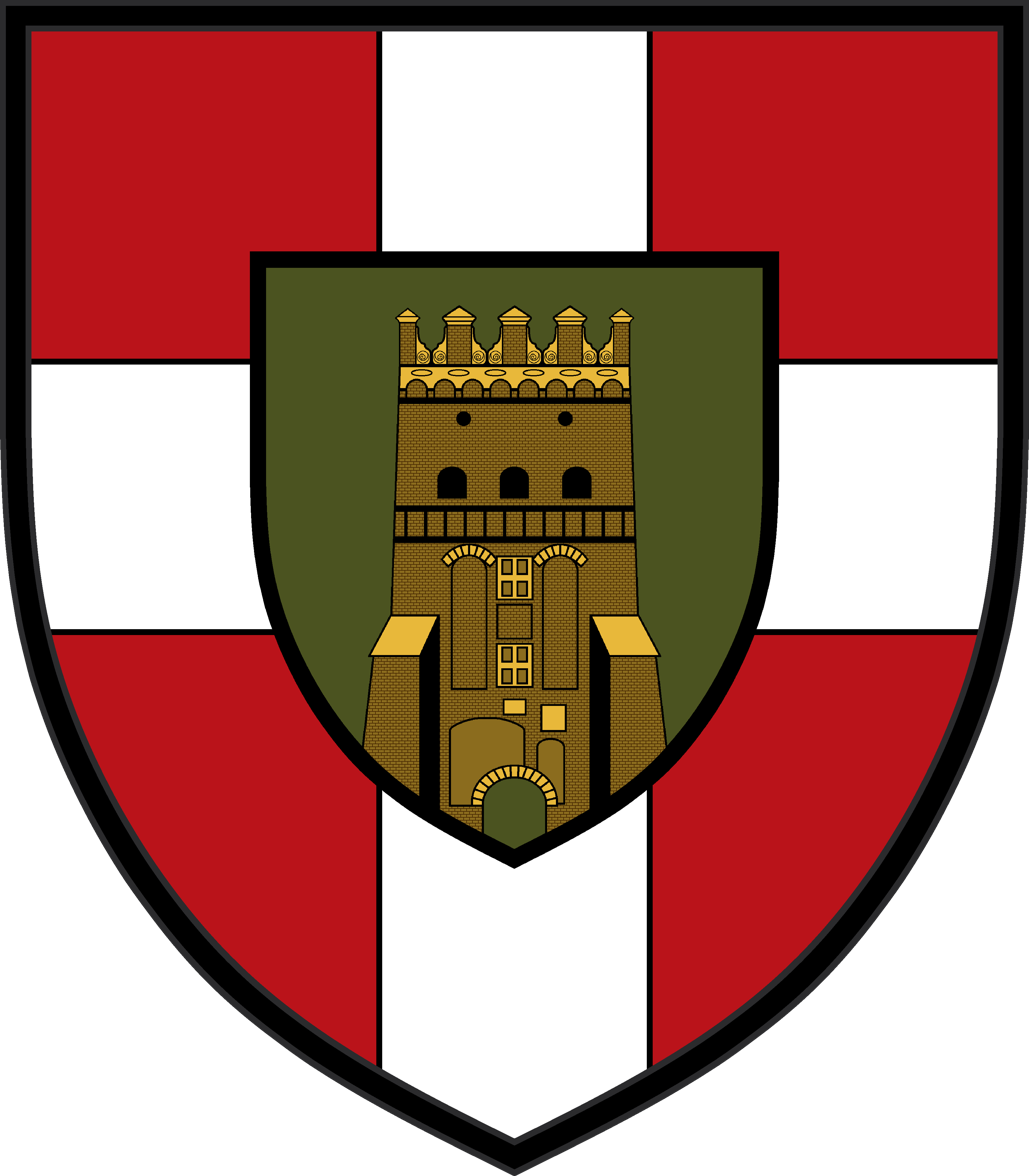
Former, and first new version of the shoulder sleeve insignia of the 100th Mechanized Brigade.

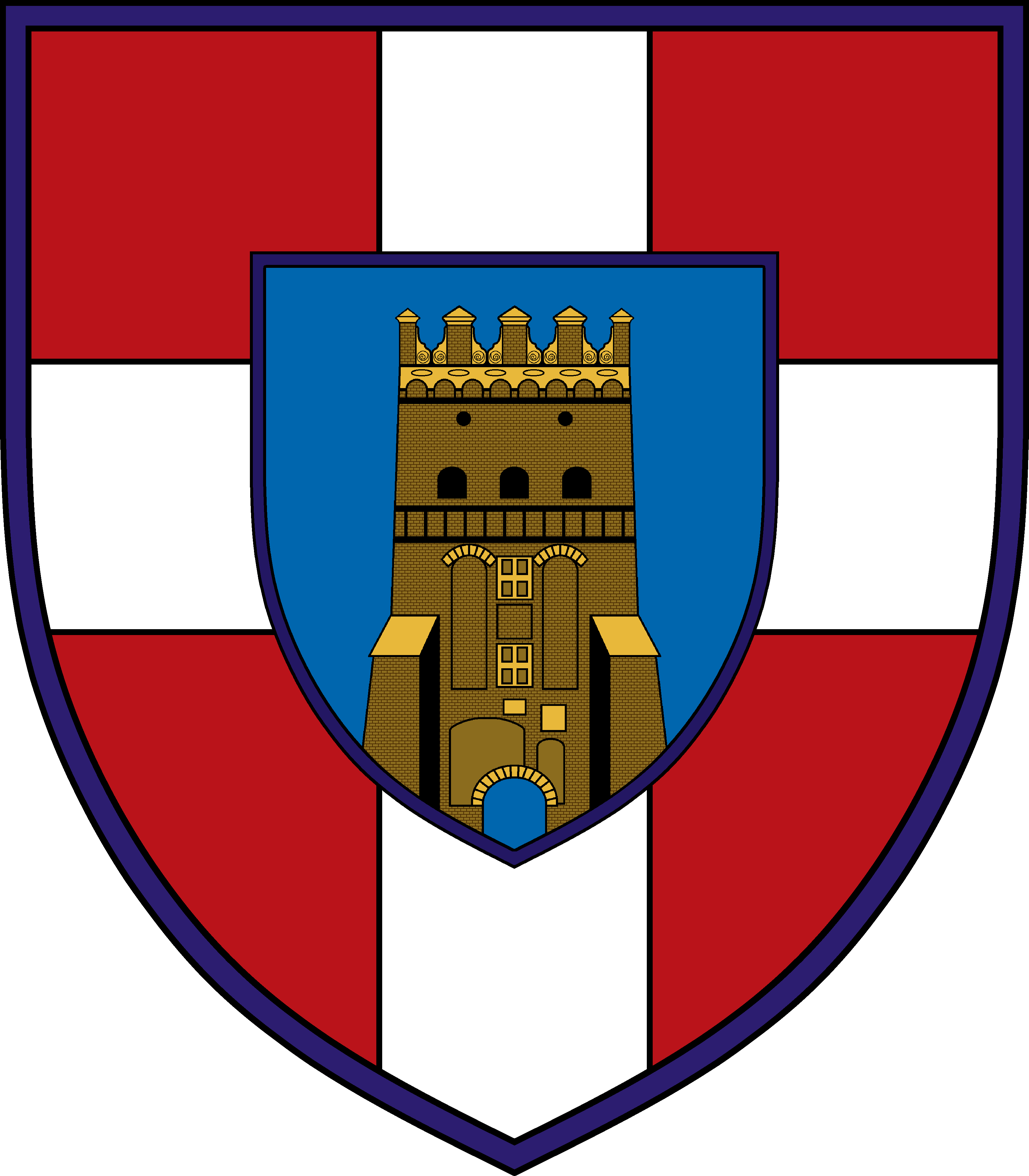
Former, and second new version of the shoulder sleeve insignia of the 100th Mechanized Brigade.

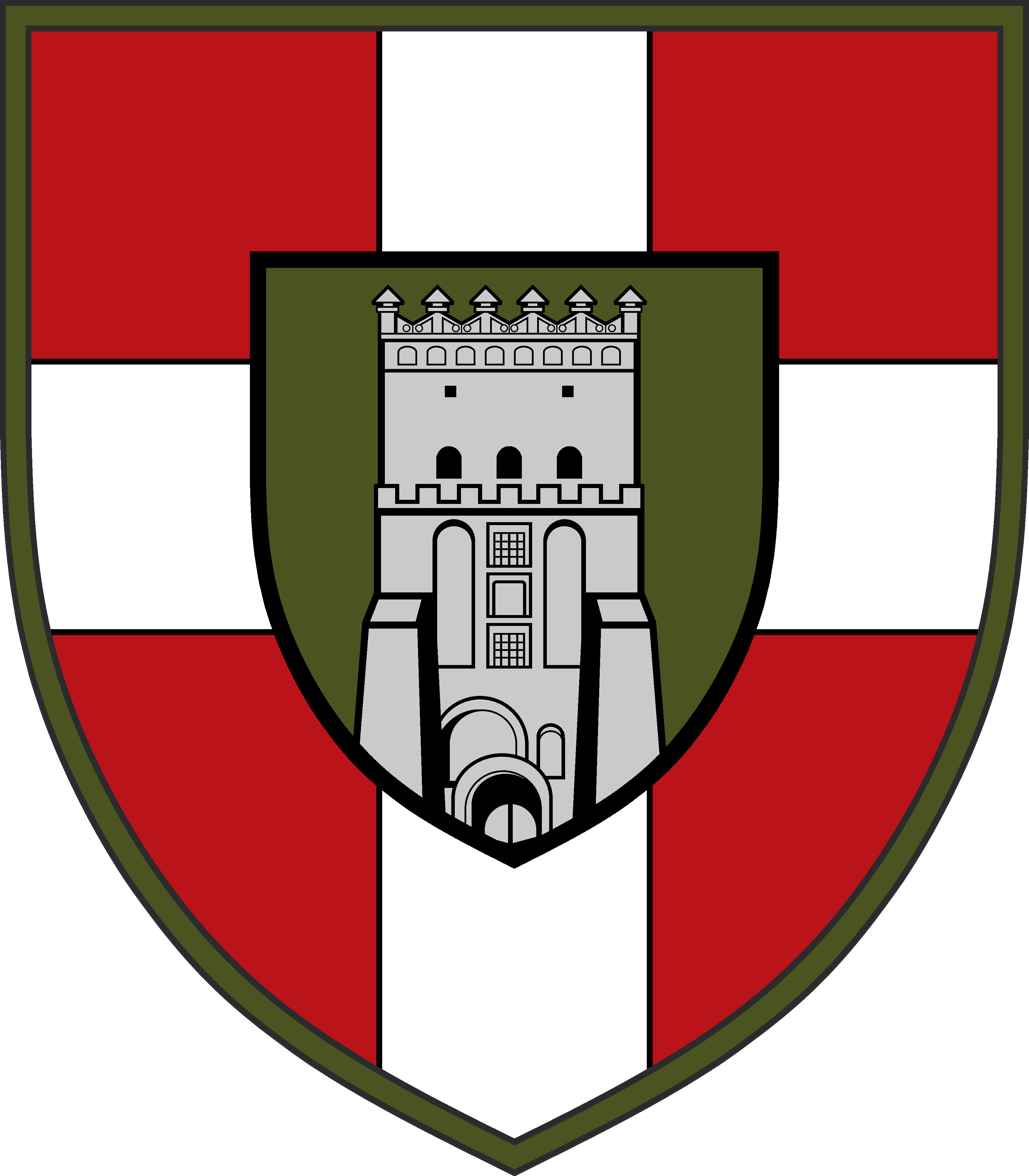
Current shoulder sleeve insignia of the 100th Mechanized Brigade.

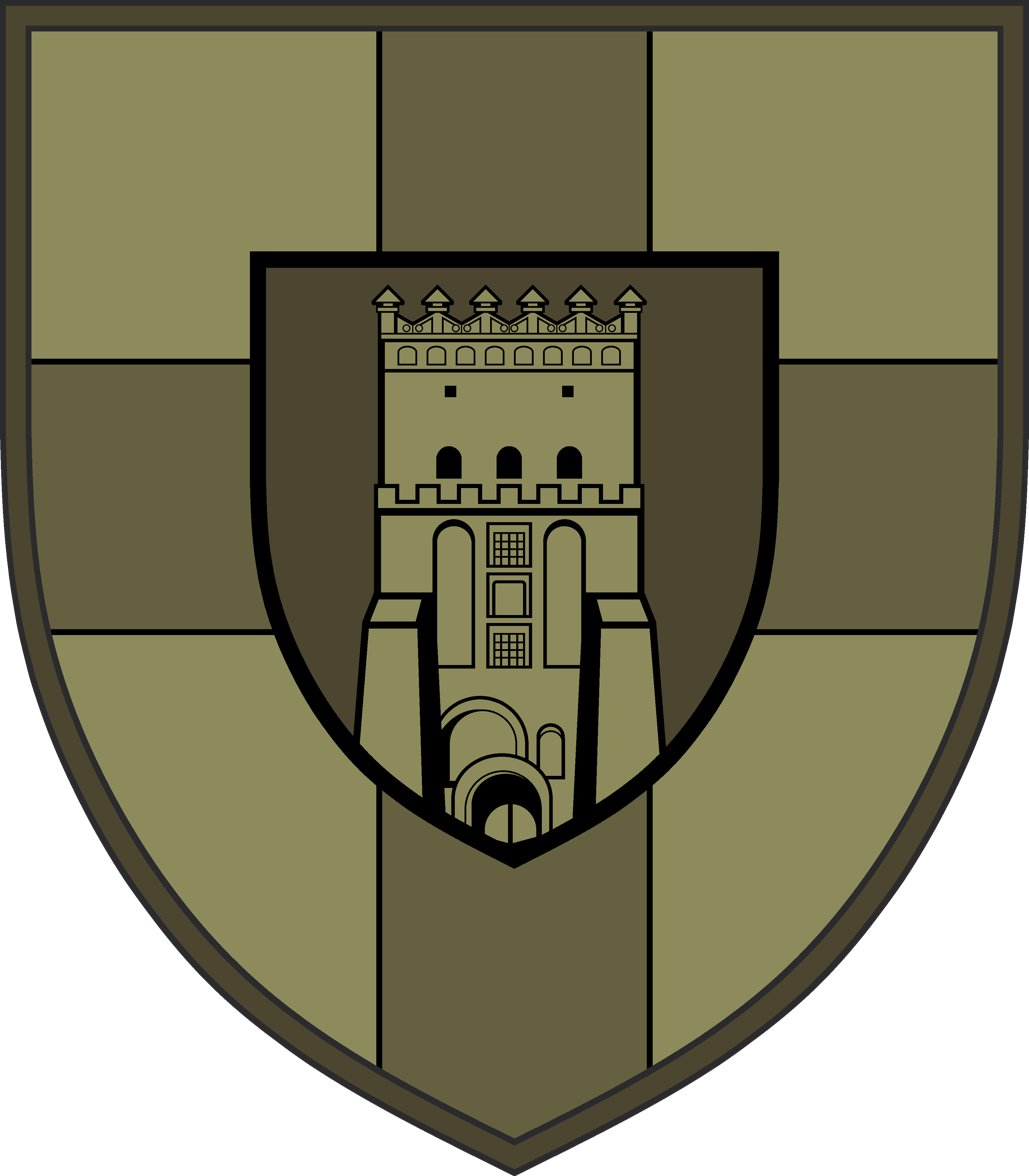
Current shoulder sleeve insignia, subdued variant, of the 100th Mechanized Brigade.

=== Issues and criticisms ===
In a report by Forbes in late April 2024, it was stated that the brigade is one of the newest and most lightly equipped in the entire Ukrainian Ground Forces. The report also mentioned that the brigade was unsuitable for the frontline conditions that commanders required. This came after the 115th Mechanized Brigade were pulled away from Ocheretyne for its reported poor performance, with many including DeepStateMap.Live holding the 115th Mechanized Brigade accountable for the loss of the settlement.

== Equipment ==
=== Vehicles ===
On 8 July 2024, it was reported in an article by David Axe that the 100th Mechanized Brigade had been equipped with German 1A3 Marder infantry fighting vehicles, reportedly giving the brigade its first major protected mobility and firepower. This became the first unit within the Ukrainian Ground Forces to receive 1A3 Marder vehicles.

As of August 2024, the brigade operates the following vehicles:

- 1A3 Marder – German infantry fighting vehicle

== Russo-Ukrainian war ==
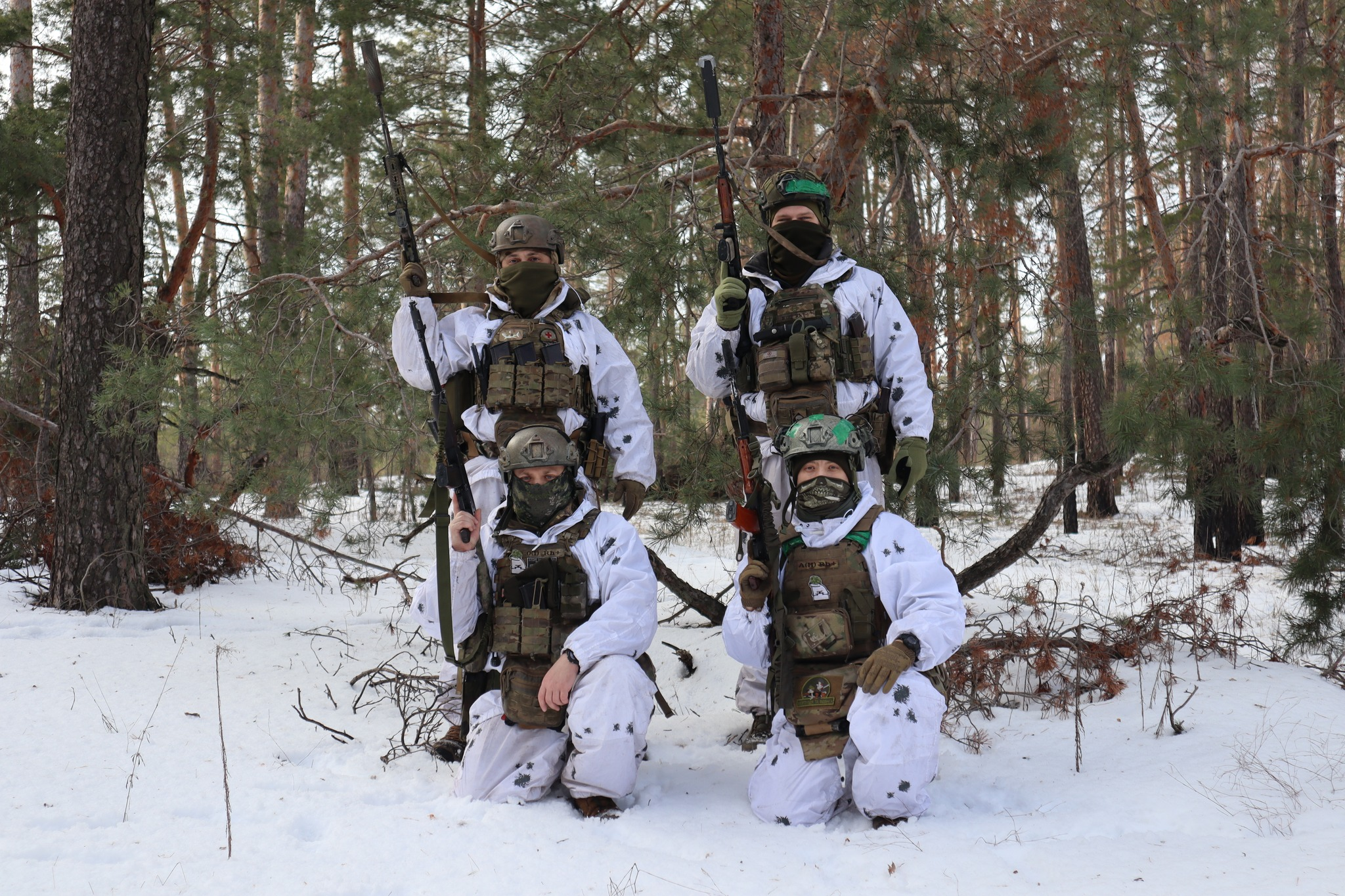
Servicemen of the 100th Territorial Defense Brigade in February 2024

=== Russian invasion of Ukraine ===
The brigade, throughout its existence, has fought extensively throughout the Russian invasion of Ukraine which begun on 24 February 2022.

In July 2022, the brigade was reportedly building fortifications on the northern border with Belarus in order to prevent a future Russian offensive that may have occurred towards Ukraine's northern border around Kyiv, an area previously attacked by Russia between February and April 2022.

On 28 July 2023, Ukrainian President Volodymyr Zelenskiy awarded "For Courage and Bravery" title to the brigade, and became the first Territorial Defense Brigade to receive the award.

It was reported by various Ukrainian media outlets that the brigade has fought extensively in the Bakhmut, Kupiansk, and Lyman directions in eastern Ukraine for over a year. The brigade's command moved four other battalions, these being the Kovel, Kamen-Kashur, and the Volodymyr battalion's in early April 2023 to perform combat missions in the Lyman area of eastern Ukraine.

==== Battle of Bakhmut ====
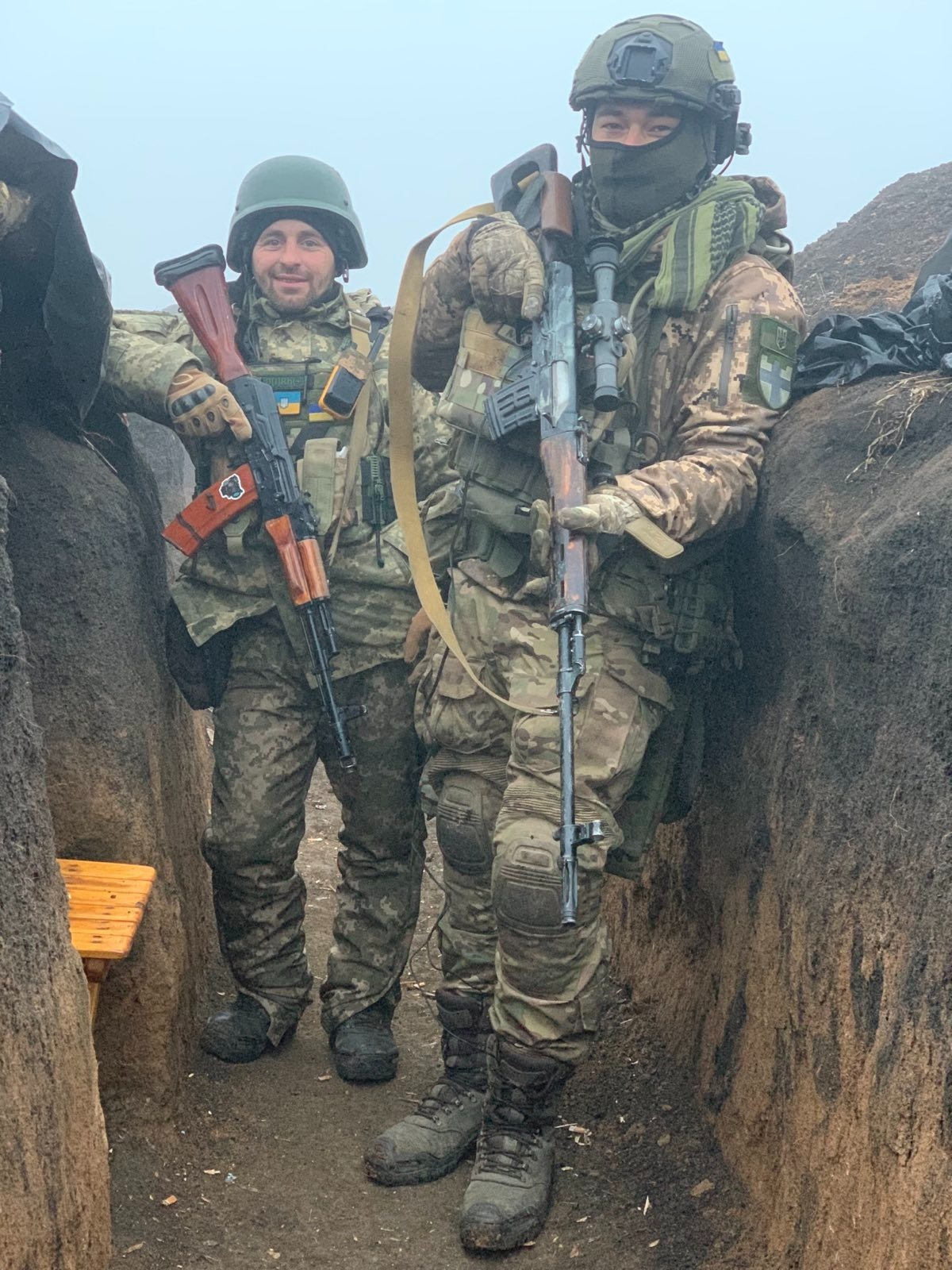
Servicemen of the 3rd Rifle Company of the Lutsk battalion in a trench in the Bakhmut direction, 23 March 2023.

At the beginning of March 2023, it was reported that the Lutsk battalion, also being designated as the 53rd Territorial Defense Battalion within the brigade, moved to the Bakhmut direction, a point in time where according to Reuters - the battle for the city was grinding down Russia's best units.

==== Battle of Ocheretyne ====
Ensuing Russia's offensive actions in Avdiivka throughout the winter of 2023 to 2024, capturing Avdiivka on 17 February 2024 after Ukraine's military withdrew from the area, many troops moved west in order to hold a defense against the Russian offensive in the vicinity. The brigade was involved in the battle for Ocheretyne, a village west of Avdiivka which saw Russian offensive actions spearhead in late April to early May 2024, capturing the village on 5 May.

In a report by Forbes, it was mentioned that the 100th Mechanized Brigade was not experienced, and that the 2,000 soldiers of the brigade had seen combat actions throughout the duration of the Russian invasion. However, it was mentioned that the brigade lacked heavy equipment alongside Western equipment such as tanks, fighting vehicles, and artillery.

The brigade reportedly fought hard in the direction, allegedly intercepting the Russian 30th Motor Rifle Brigade as well as other units composing the Russian 41st Combined Arms Army when advancing towards the Prohres, a village seven miles to the west along the same railroad linking Avdiivka and Ocheretyne. In a report by DeepStateMap.Live, an online interactive Ukrainian mapping site, the 100th Mechanized Brigade successfully counterattacked a Russian advances towards Prohres, stopping the assault.

Despite the efforts of the brigade, the village fell on 5 May 2024, with it being stated by The Guardian that it was "left in ruins" after being battered in fighting.

==== Battle of Toretsk ====
The brigade was deployed to Toretsk prior to August 2024, helping in the defence against the Russian offensive in the Toretsk direction. The brigade's VORON drone unit has been involved heavily in the defense of Toretsk, using attack drones to target Russian soldiers.

On 18 August 2024, Ukrainian President Volodymyr Zelenskyy recognised the efforts of the 100th Mechanized Brigade in the defense of Toretsk.

It was reported on 20 August 2024 that the official Kremlin statement named that the 100th Mechanized Brigade, alongside other units such as the 25th Airborne Brigade and the 120th Territorial Defense Brigade had been "defeated" around settlements in Toretsk and Niu York. According to a report by TASS, a state-owned pro-Russian news agency, Russia's Battlegroup 'Center' claimed to have inflicted 585 casualties on Ukrainian forces in a single day over the aforementioned Ukrainian units.

In May 2025, the brigade suffered heavy losses during an unsuccessful attempt to counterattack in the city.

== Structure ==
As of 30 March 2024 the brigade's structure is as follows:

- 100th Mechanized Brigade
  - Headquarters
  - 50th Territorial Defense Battalion (Ratne) MUN А7059
  - 51st Territorial Defense Battalion (Kamin-Kashyrskyi) MUN А7060
  - 52nd Territorial Defense Battalion (Manevychi) MUN А7061
  - 53rd Territorial Defense Battalion (Lutsk) MUN А7062
    - 3rd Rifle Company
  - 54th Territorial Defense Battalion (Kovel) MUN А7063
  - 55th Territorial Defense Battalion (Volodymyr) MUN А7064
  - Aerial Reconnaissance and Strike UAV Unit "Voron 100"
  - Counter-Sabotage Company
  - Engineering Company
  - Communication Company
  - Logistics Company
  - Mortar Battery

== See also ==
- 3rd Assault Brigade
- 115th Mechanized Brigade
- Russian Volunteer Corps
