= Ocheretyne School =

Former school in Donetsk Oblast, Ukraine

Ocheretyne Settlement Comprehensive School of Levels I–III
- Загальноосвітня школа І–ІІІ ступенів смт Очеретине
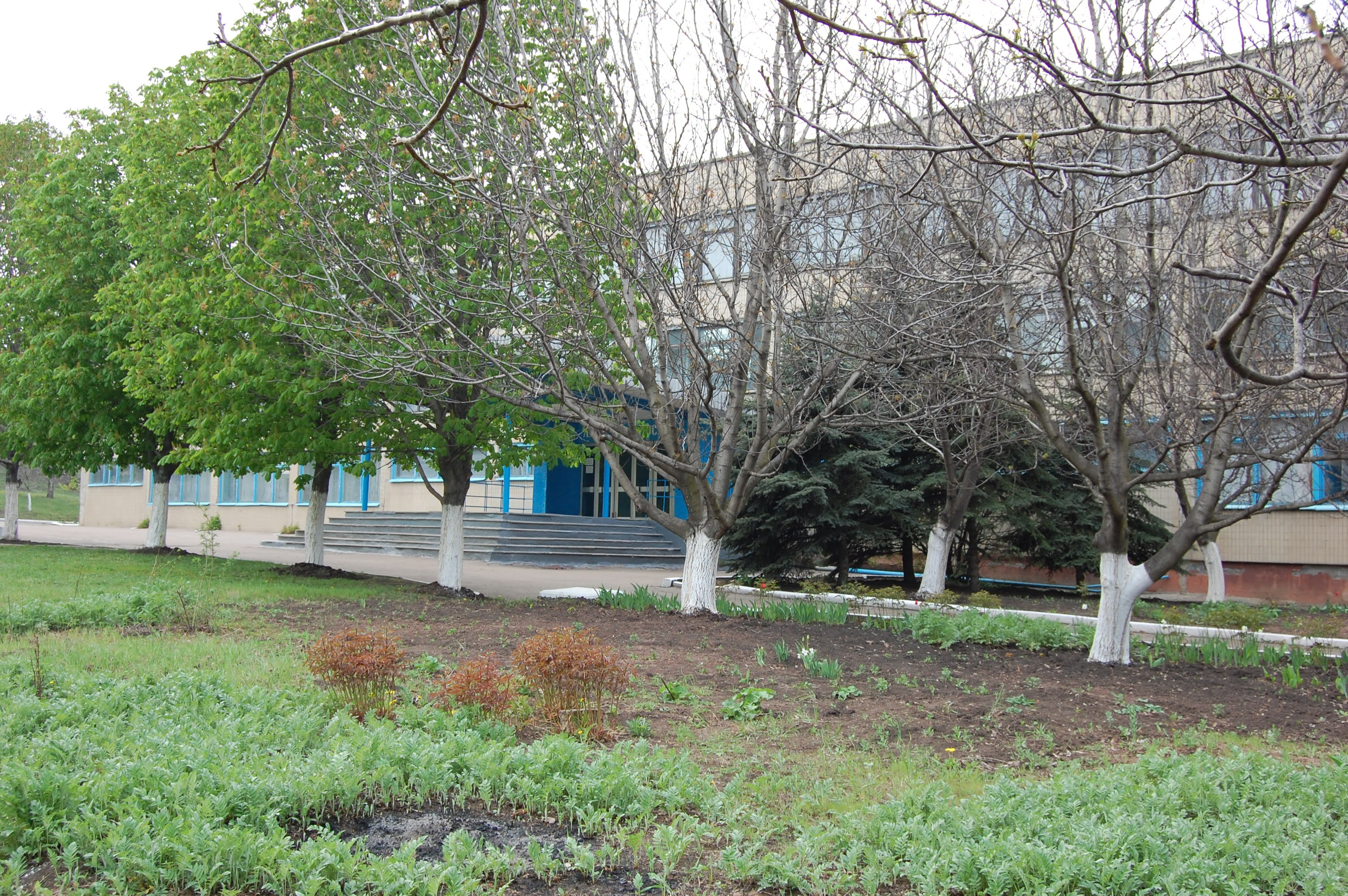
- The school in Ocheretyne

Location
- Ocheretyne; Pokrovsk Raion; Donetsk Oblast; Ukraine; 48.249466°N 37.619927°E

Information
- Type: Public general-education school
- Status: Destroyed during the temporary Russian occupation (2024)
- Language: Ukrainian

Ocheretyne School (Ukrainian: Очеретинська школа), formally the Ocheretyne Settlement Comprehensive School of Levels I–III (Ukrainian: Загальноосвітня школа І–ІІІ ступенів смт Очеретине), was a public general-education school in Ocheretyne, an urban-type settlement in Pokrovsk Raion, Donetsk Oblast, eastern Ukraine. As a school of Levels I–III, it provided the full eleven-year cycle of Ukrainian general secondary education — primary (Level I, grades 1–4), basic secondary (Level II, grades 5–9), and complete general secondary (Level III, grades 10–11). The school served the population of Ocheretyne and surrounding villages of the Ocheretyne settlement hromada for several decades during the Soviet and independent-Ukrainian periods. The building was renovated in 2015. An adjacent indoor swimming pool of Soviet-era construction operated until 1995. The school was destroyed during the fighting and subsequent temporary Russian occupation of Ocheretyne in 2024, as part of the wider destruction of the settlement during the Russian invasion of Ukraine.

Until Ukraine's 2020 administrative reform, the school was located in the now-abolished Yasynuvata Raion; an entrance plaque photographed in 2009 still bore that designation. With the merger of raions in July 2020, its territory became part of Pokrovsk Raion.

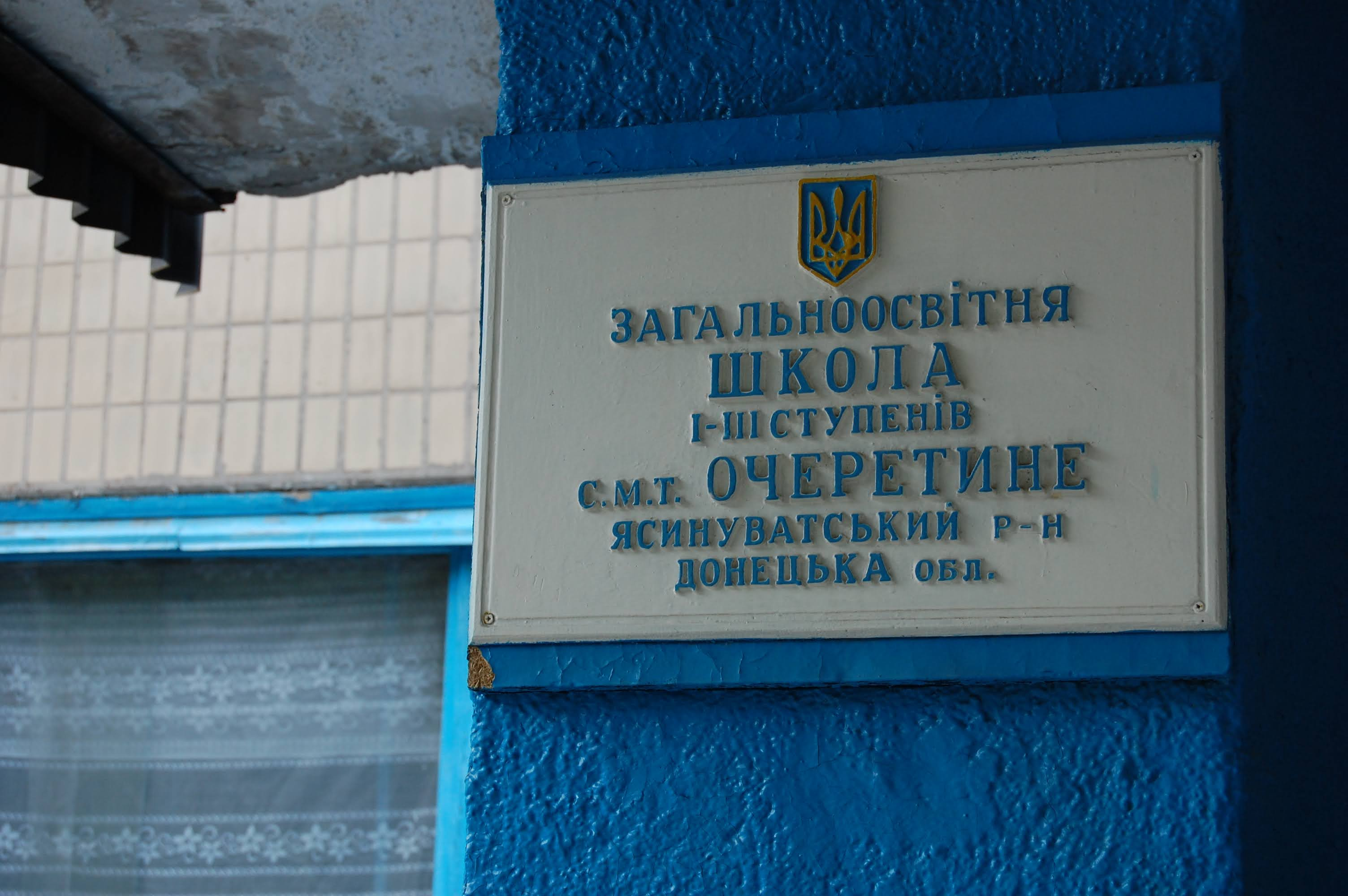
Entrance plaque of the school photographed in 2009, bearing the formal name and the pre-2020 raion designation

== Building and facilities ==
The school occupied a three-storey masonry building of Soviet-era construction in the centre of Ocheretyne, with a design capacity of about 450 pupils. Photographs taken in 2007 and 2009 show the original, unrenovated façade — weathered paintwork on a plain rectangular volume, with a porch and signage above the main entrance — typical of late-Soviet institutional architecture in eastern Ukraine.

The building underwent a renovation in 2015, which included refurbishment of the exterior and entrance areas. Among the surviving original decorative features was a mosaic set into the floor of one of the interior corridors.

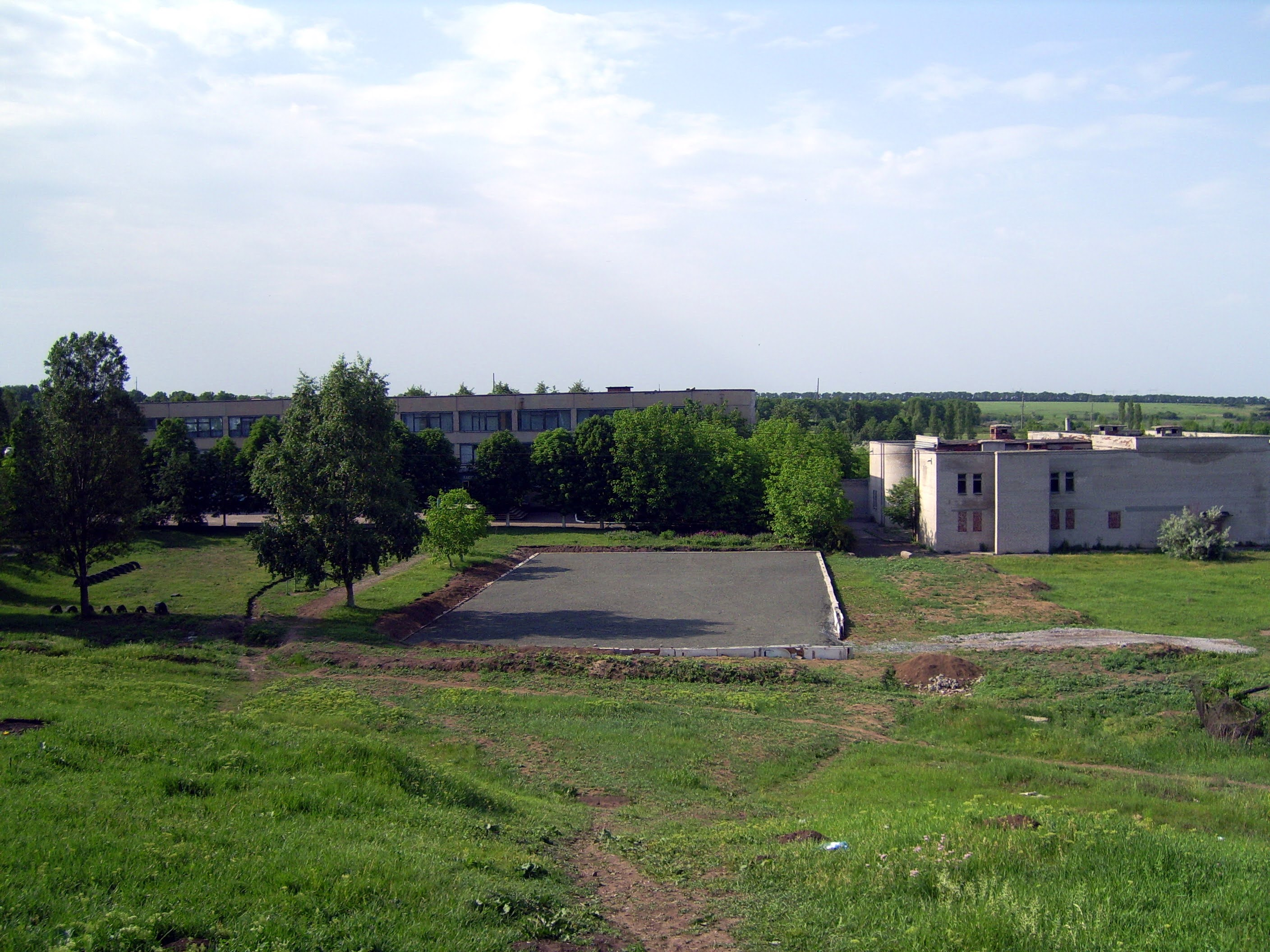
The school in June 2007, showing the pre-renovation façade

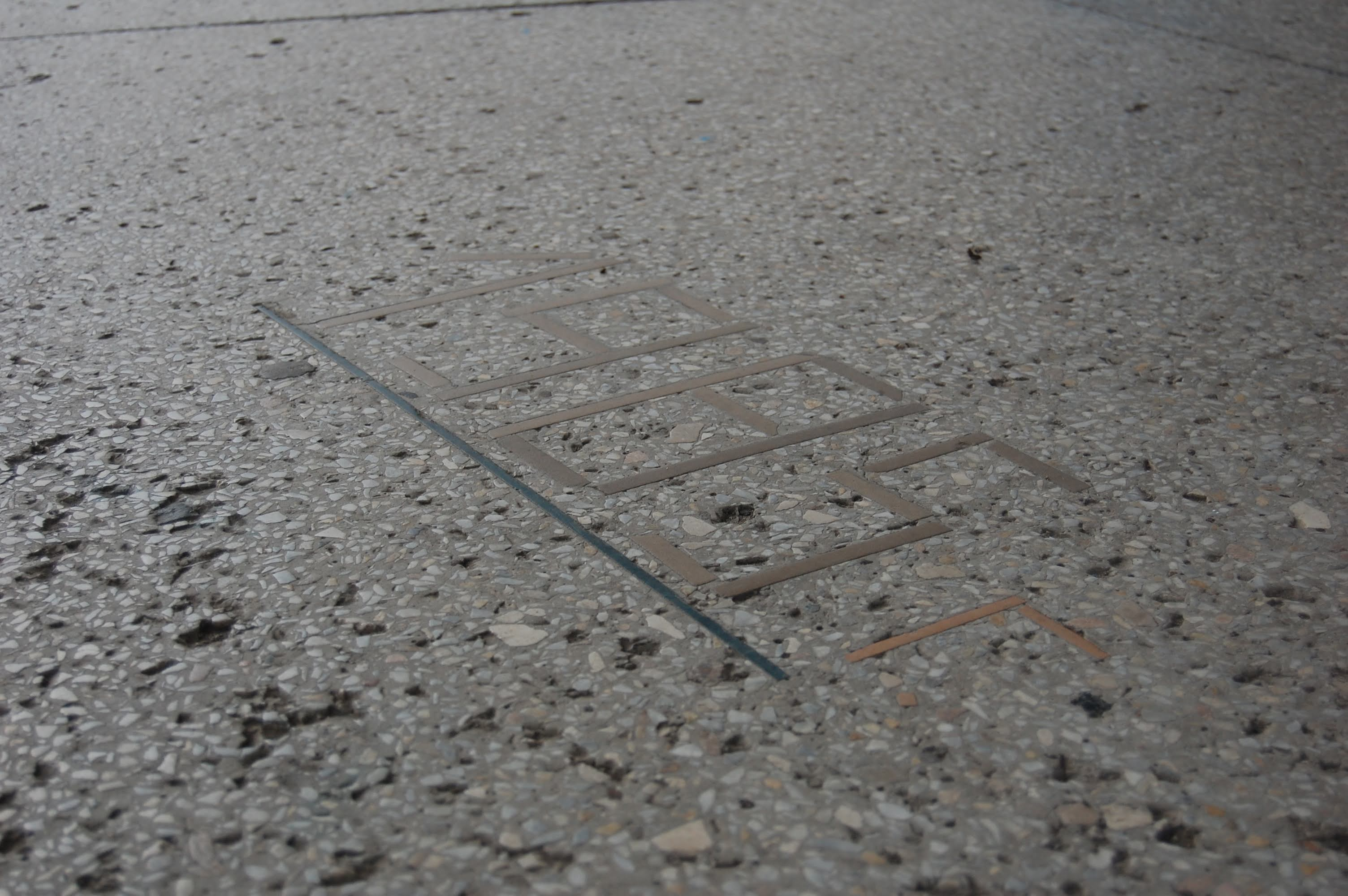
Mosaic on the floor of one of the interior corridors — among the surviving original decorative features of the building

=== Classrooms and specialised cabinets ===
In addition to general classrooms, the school operated dedicated subject classrooms — known in the Ukrainian school tradition as kabinets (Ukrainian: кабінети) — for biology, physics and chemistry, each equipped with subject-specific demonstration equipment, charts and teaching materials. A computer classroom was likewise maintained and was refurbished and re-equipped as part of the 2015 works. The interior also included a large conference and assembly hall that was used for school performances, end-of-year ceremonies, parents' meetings and other community events.

=== Cafeteria ===
The school had a cafeteria with its own on-site kitchen, in which meals were prepared from scratch each day rather than reheated from pre-cooked deliveries — at the time a relatively common arrangement in rural Ukrainian schools, but one that had become rarer in many urban schools by the 2010s.

=== Sports facilities ===
Sports facilities included a large indoor sports hall used for physical education lessons and competitions, together with several outdoor sports areas on the school grounds: open-air exercise yards with permanent equipment, a football pitch, and additional recreational fields used for break-time play and after-school activities. The football pitch was modernised in 2008 as part of the wider improvements to the school grounds, and was used both for physical-education lessons and for matches of the school's football team. These facilities supported the school's strong sports tradition (see below).

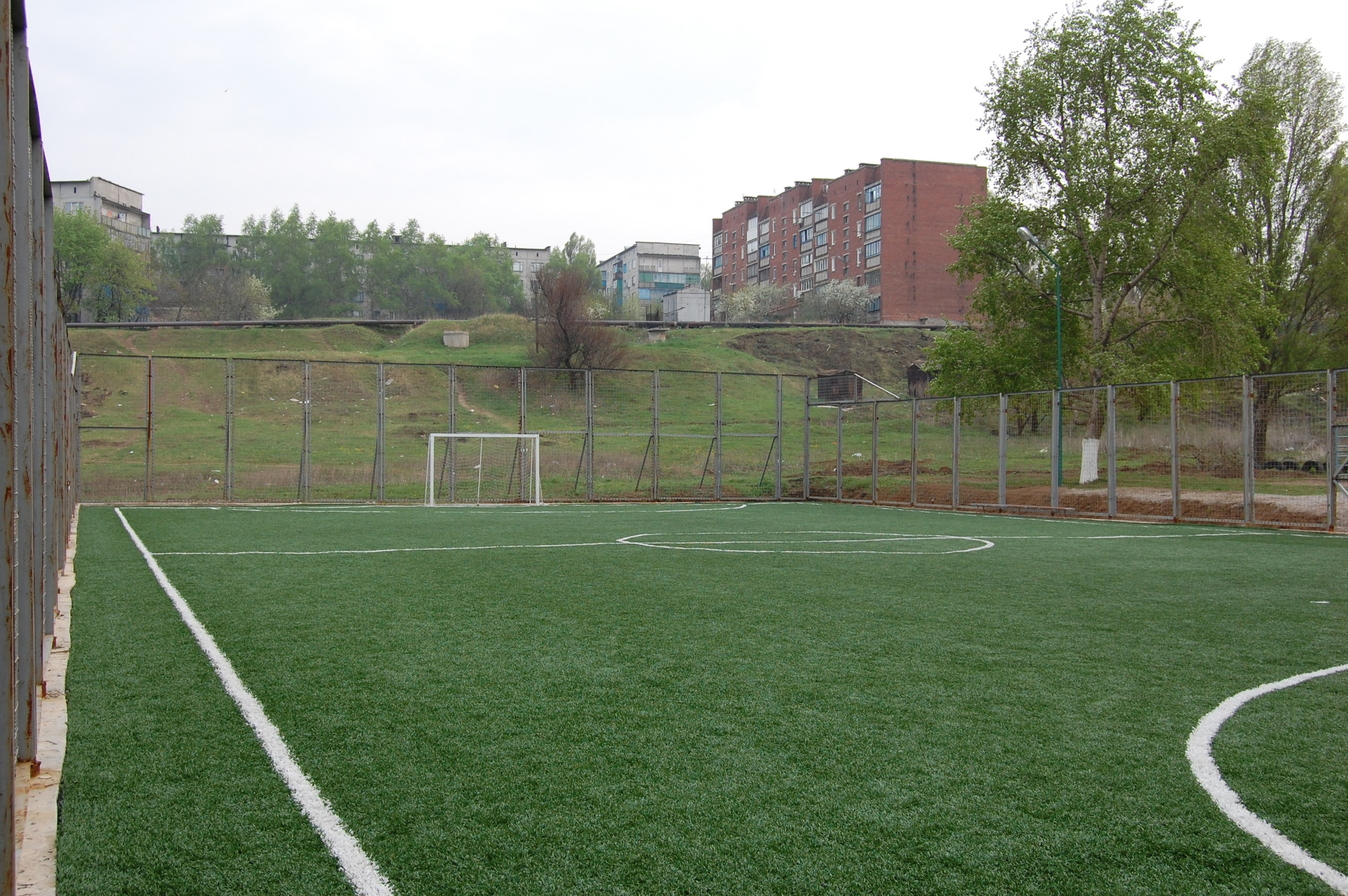
The football pitch on the school grounds, modernised in 2008

== Use as a polling station ==
During Ukrainian national and local elections, the school building was consistently designated as a polling station for residents of Ocheretyne and the surrounding catchment villages. This role — typical for general-education schools across Ukraine — meant that the building also served as a focal point of civic life in the settlement, beyond its day-to-day function as a school.

== Catchment area and staff ==
Ocheretyne School drew its pupils from a wide rural catchment that extended well beyond the settlement of Ocheretyne itself. Although individually small, the surrounding villages together accounted for a substantial share of the school's enrolment. Children travelled in daily from:

- Arkhanhelske
- Novobakhmutivka
- Soloviove
- Sokil
- Novokalynove

A dedicated school bus operated daily on a route through these villages, bringing pupils in for the start of lessons and returning them at the end of the school day. For many of the smaller settlements, which had no school of their own — or only a Level I (primary) school — Ocheretyne School was the principal place where children completed their basic and full secondary education.

The teaching staff was likewise drawn from a wider area than Ocheretyne alone. Several teachers commuted from the nearby city of Avdiivka and from the village of Novooleksandrivka.

== Sports ==
The school maintained a strong tradition in sport, particularly association football. Its school football team, known as Khliborob (Ukrainian: Хлібороб, literally "grain grower" — a common name for rural sports clubs in Soviet and post-Soviet Ukraine), competed regularly in both Donetsk Oblast schools' tournaments and national-level competitions for school teams, representing Ocheretyne and the wider hromada.

== Swimming pool ==
An indoor swimming pool was built next to the school during the Soviet era and served pupils and the wider community of Ocheretyne. The pool ceased to operate in 1995, in the wave of closures of energy-intensive municipal sports and recreation facilities that followed Ukrainian independence and the post-Soviet economic downturn of the 1990s. The structure itself remained standing but unused; photographs taken in 2009 show it in a derelict, abandoned state, with the pool basin empty and the surrounding fittings stripped or decaying.

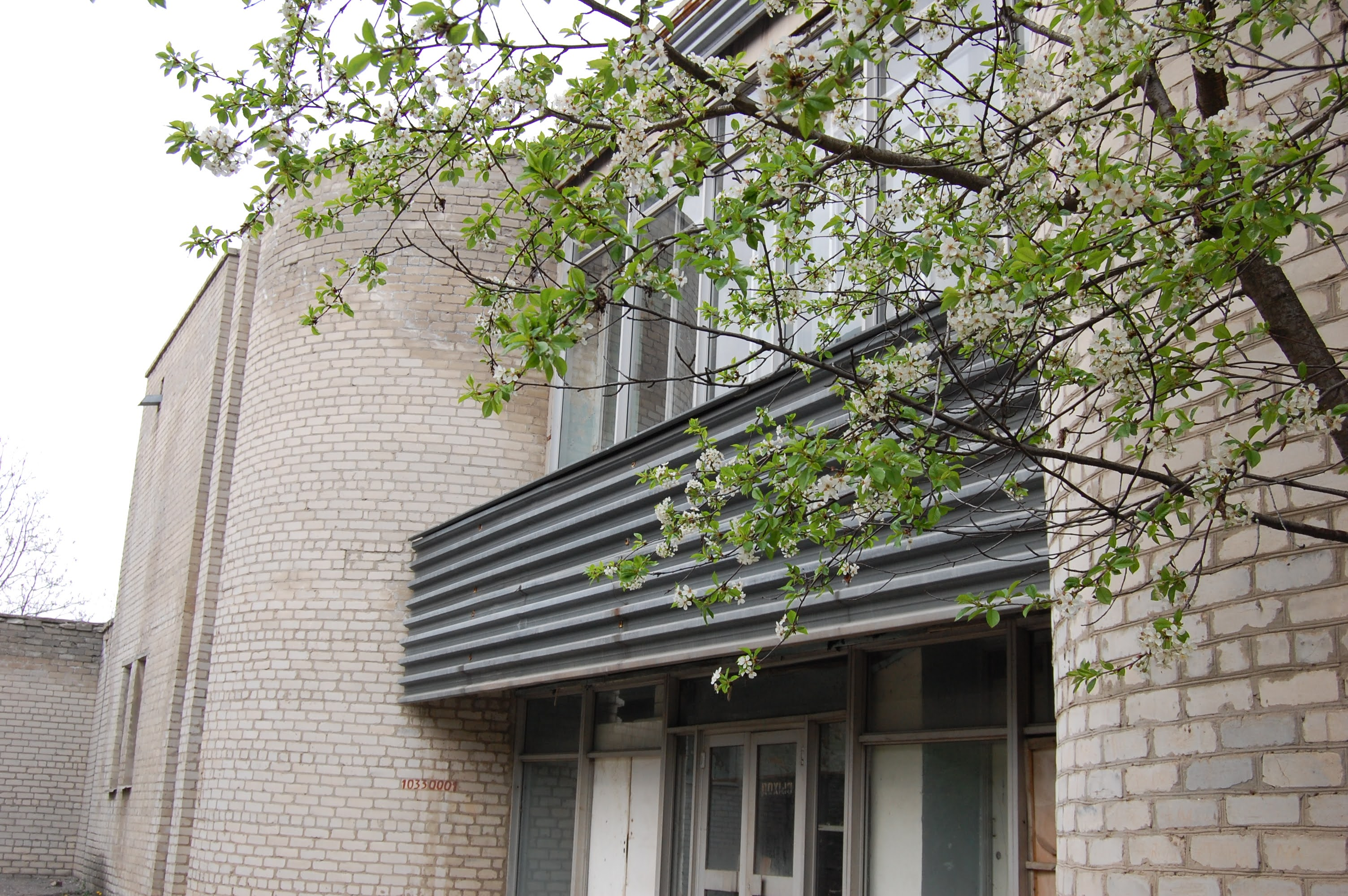
The disused indoor swimming pool beside the school, photographed in 2009. The pool had been closed since 1995.

== Destruction during the temporary Russian occupation ==
Ocheretyne came under sustained Russian assault in the spring of 2024 as part of the wider Russian offensive towards Pokrovsk. Russian forces advanced towards the settlement in mid-April 2024, entered the settlement in the second half of April, and had largely seized it by early May 2024, with the Russian Ministry of Defence confirming the capture of Ocheretyne on 5 May 2024. Weeks of artillery and aerial bombardment destroyed a large share of the settlement's buildings; Ukrainian sources reported by late April 2024 that there was scarcely an undamaged structure left in Ocheretyne. The school building was destroyed during this period of fighting and the subsequent temporary occupation.

== Notable principals and teachers ==
The following staff are documented on a 2000–2001 9th-grade class poster of the school:

- Valentyna Ivanivna Sosedsko (Соседко Валентина Іванівна) — principal (директор); served in this role for many years
- Olha Andriivna Vaschuk (Ващук Ольга Андріївна) — deputy principal for academic affairs (завуч)
- Olha Petrivna Tryfonova (Трифонова Ольга Петрівна) — class teacher (класний керівник)
- Iryna Anatoliivna Abramova (Абрамова Ірина Анатоліївна) — teacher of mathematics
- Valentyna Yuvenalinivna Кlimenko (Кліменко Валентина Ювеналінівна) — teacher of biology
- Larysa Mykolaivna Mushchynska (Мущинська Лариса Миколаївна) — teacher of chemistry

== Gallery ==
Additional photographs of the school and its surroundings, taken by photographer Oleks-g and released on Wikimedia Commons:

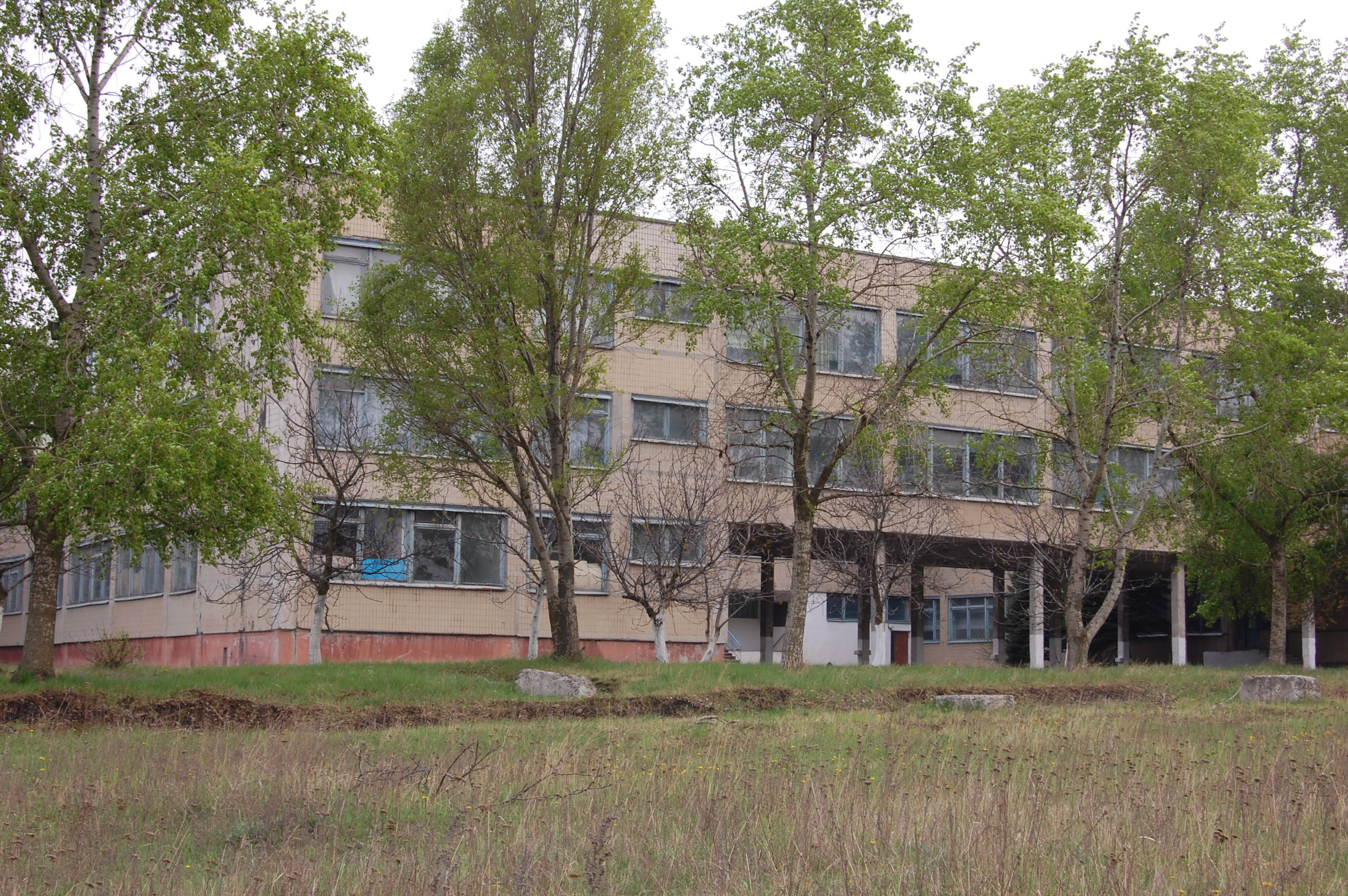
The school in May 2009, before its 2015 renovation

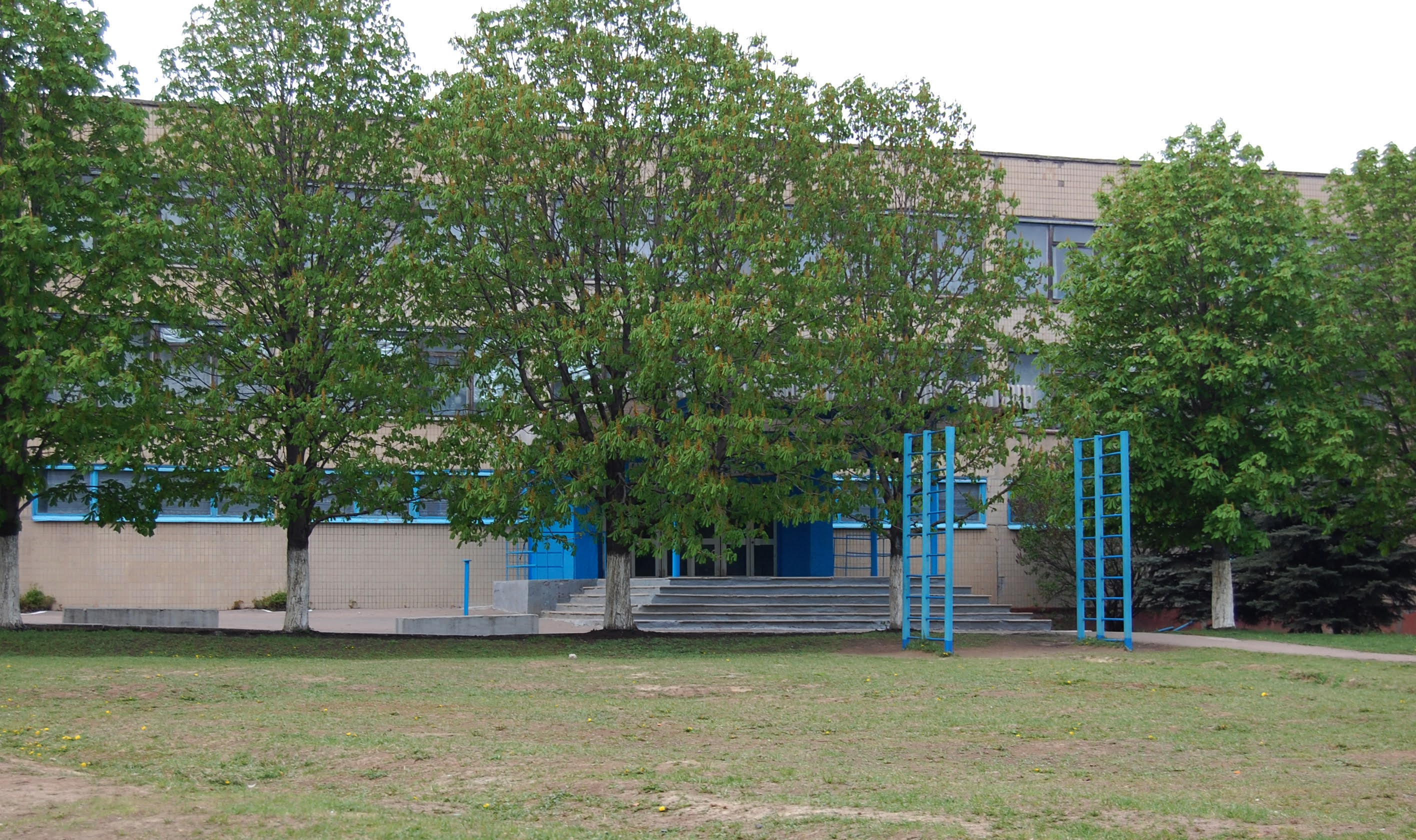
The school, front view

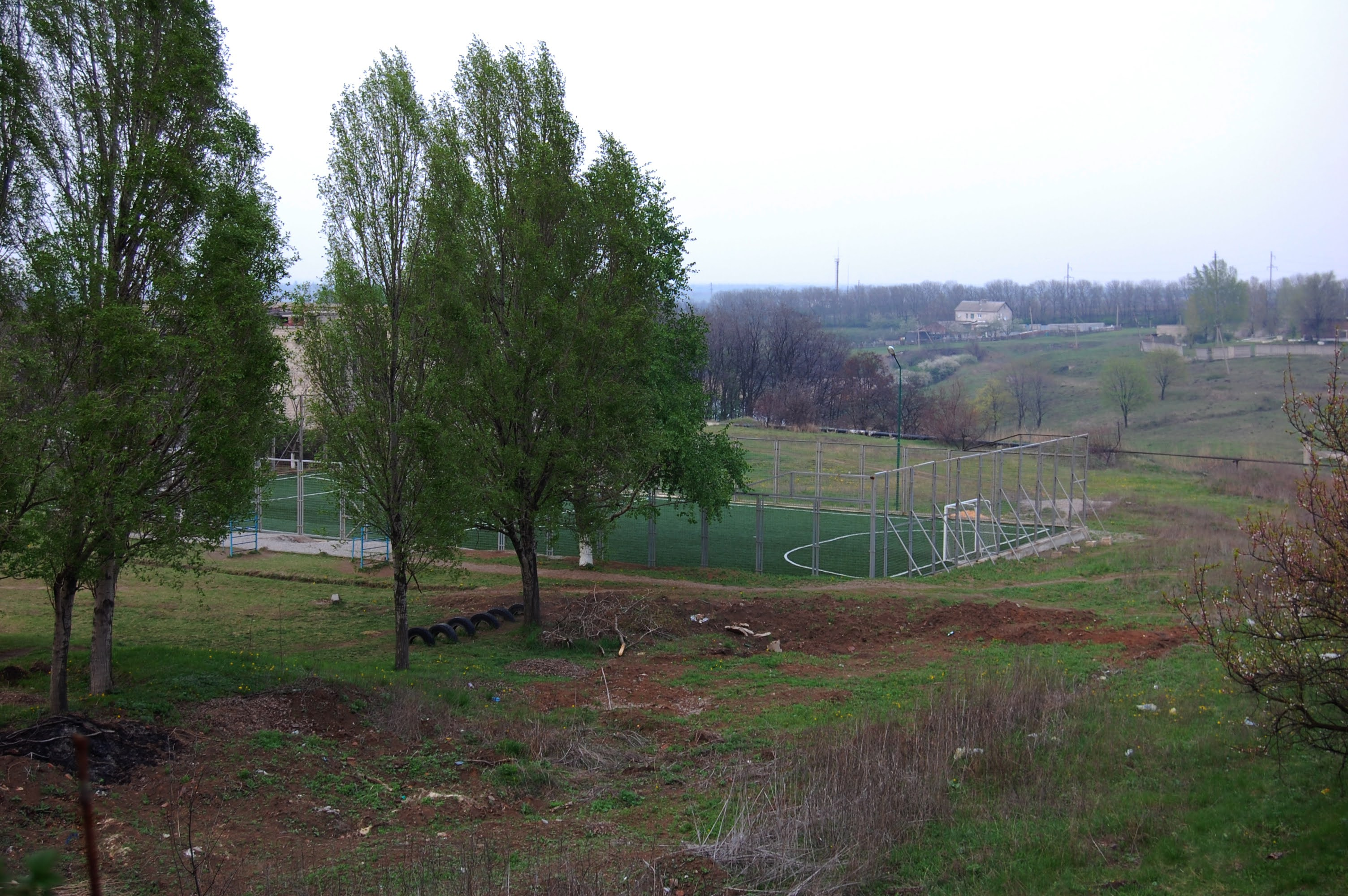
The school, alternative view

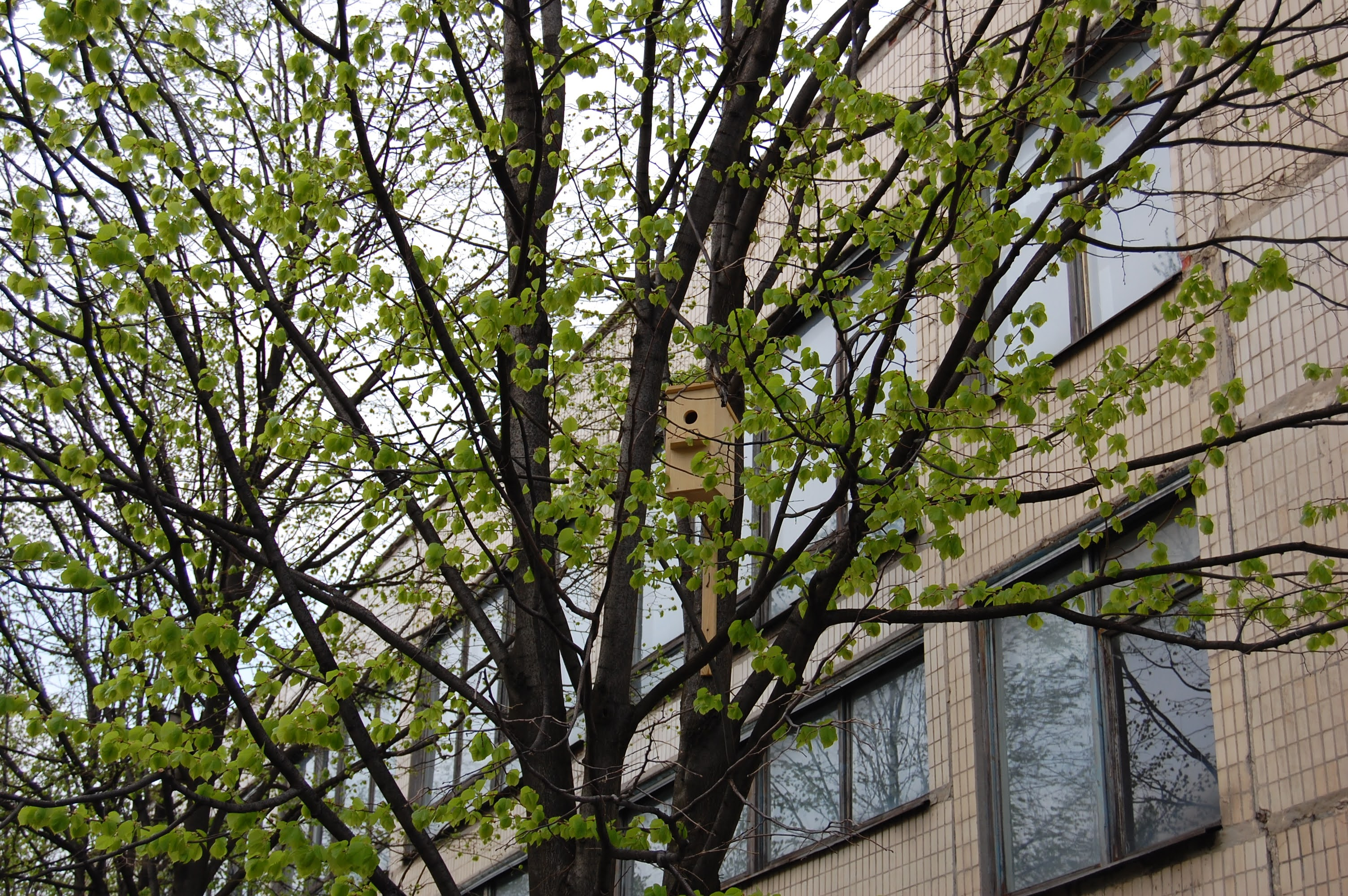
The school building

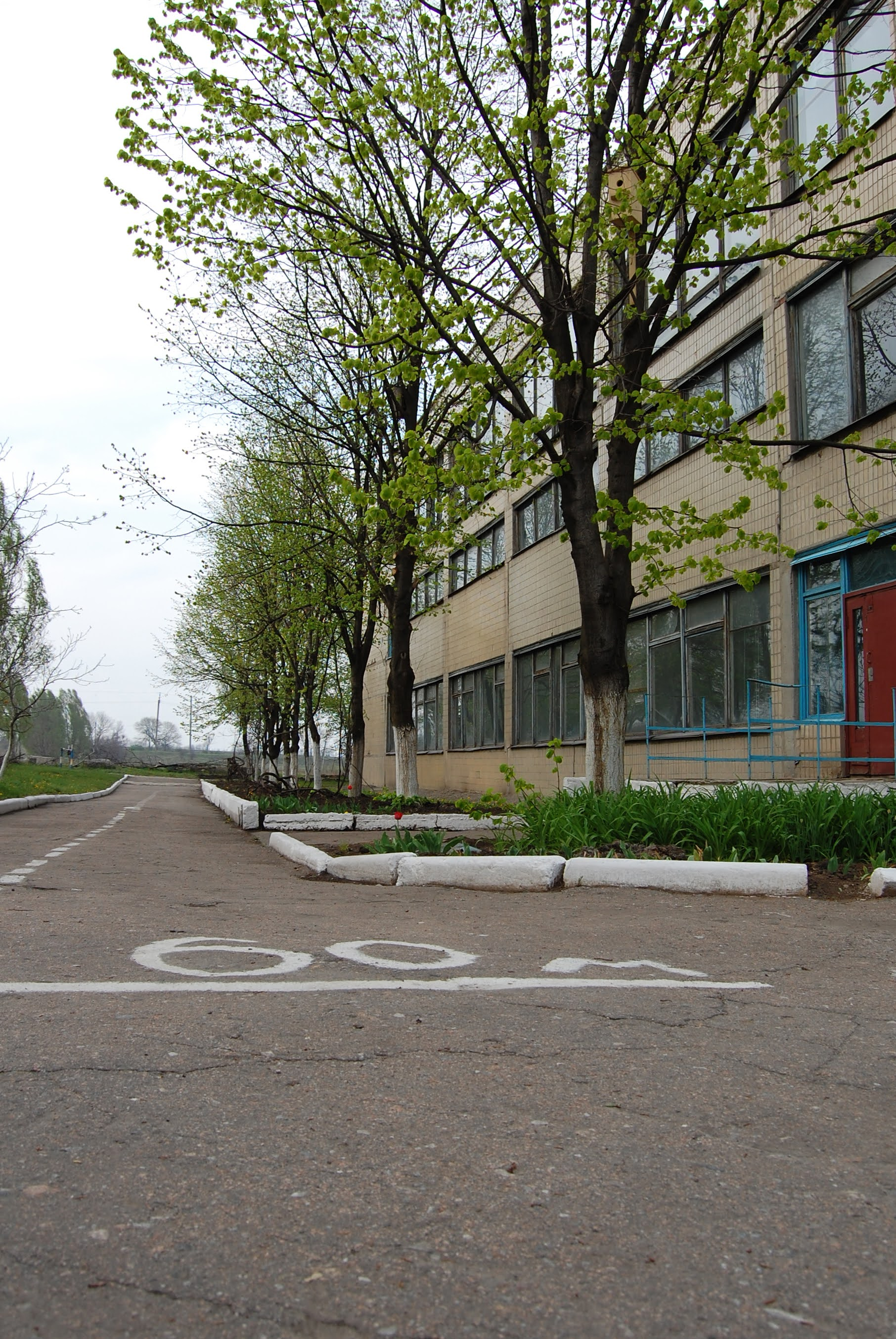
The school, side view

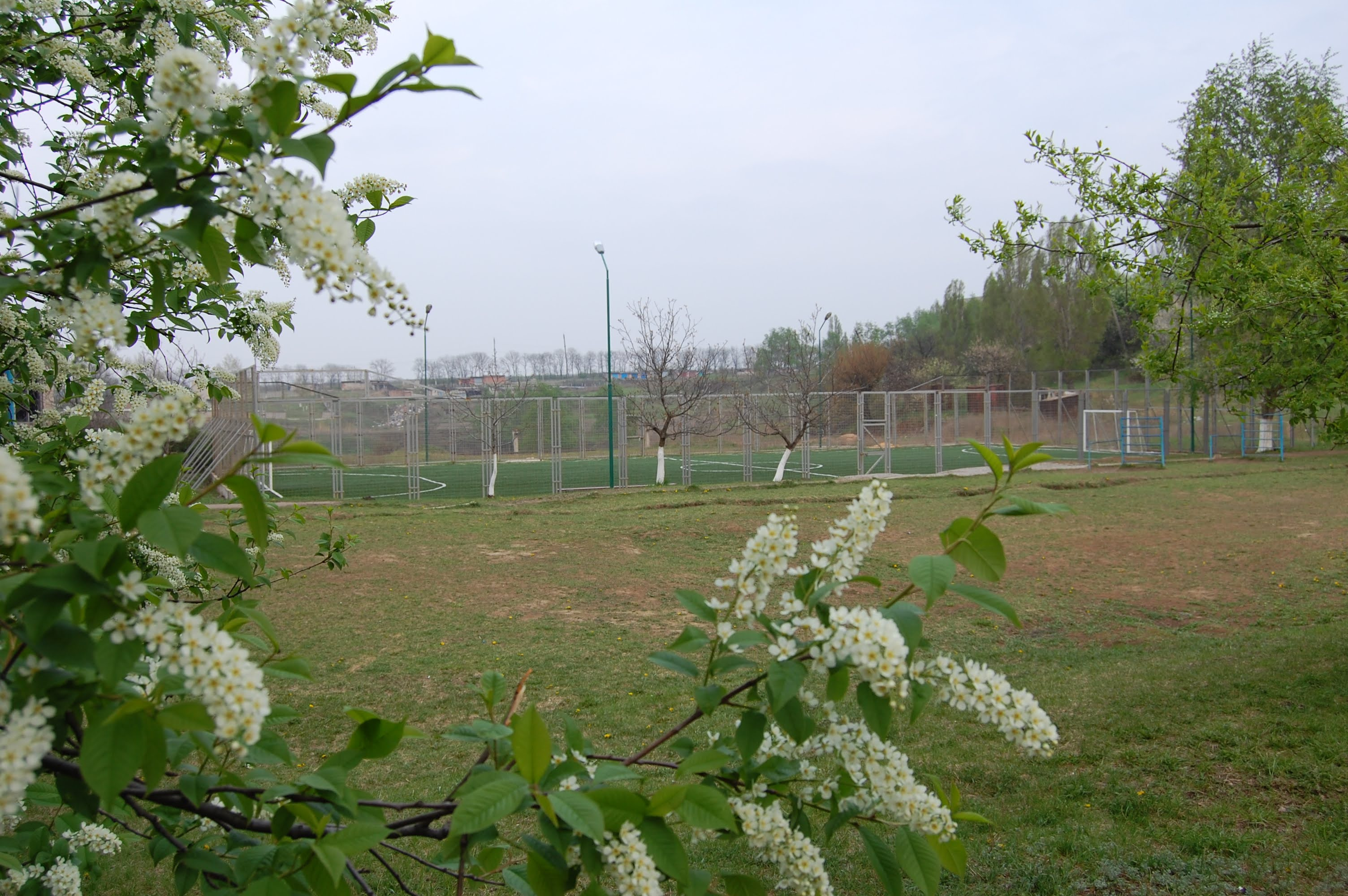
The school exterior

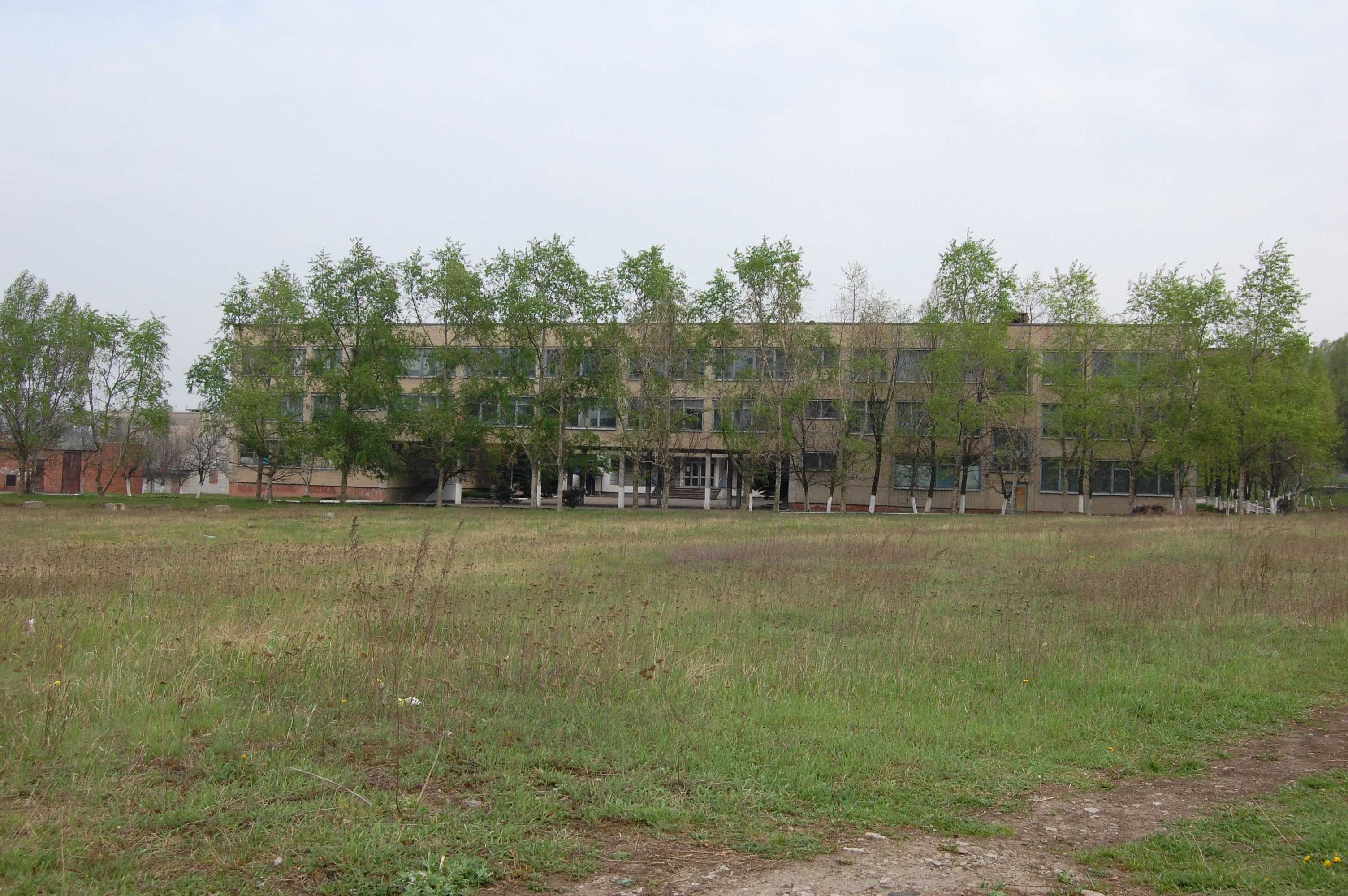
The school, another angle

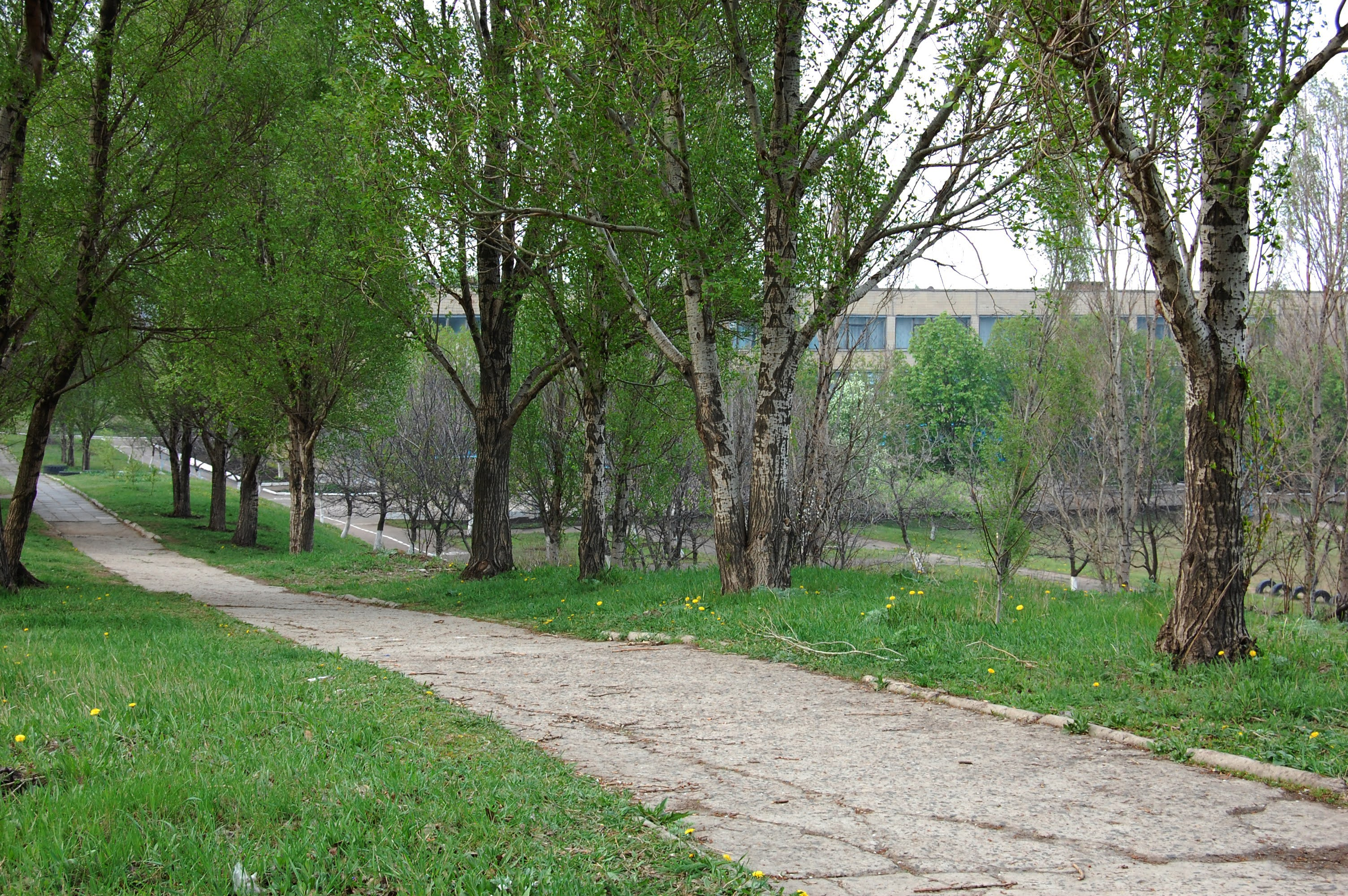
The road leading to the school

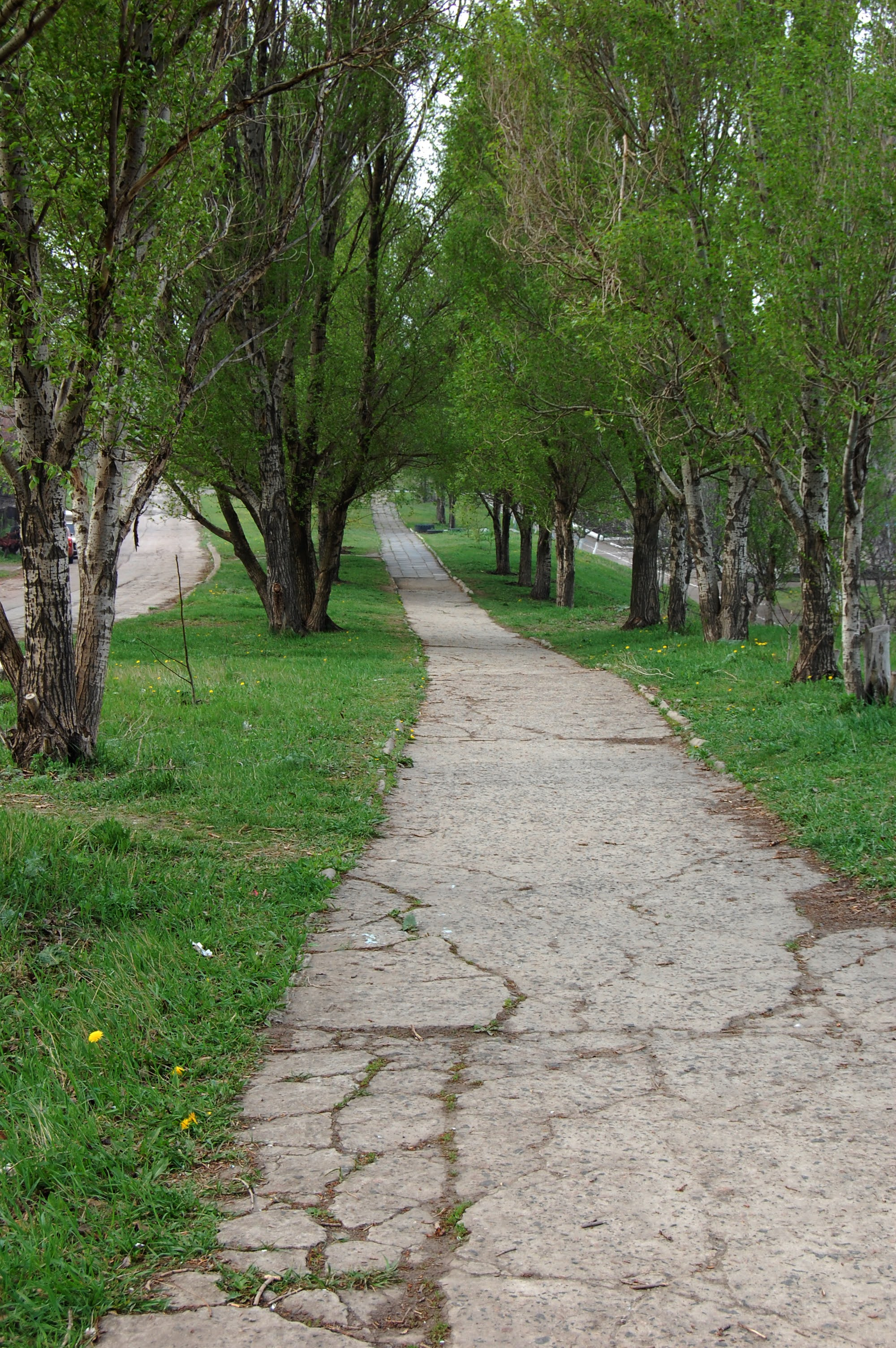
Approach to the school

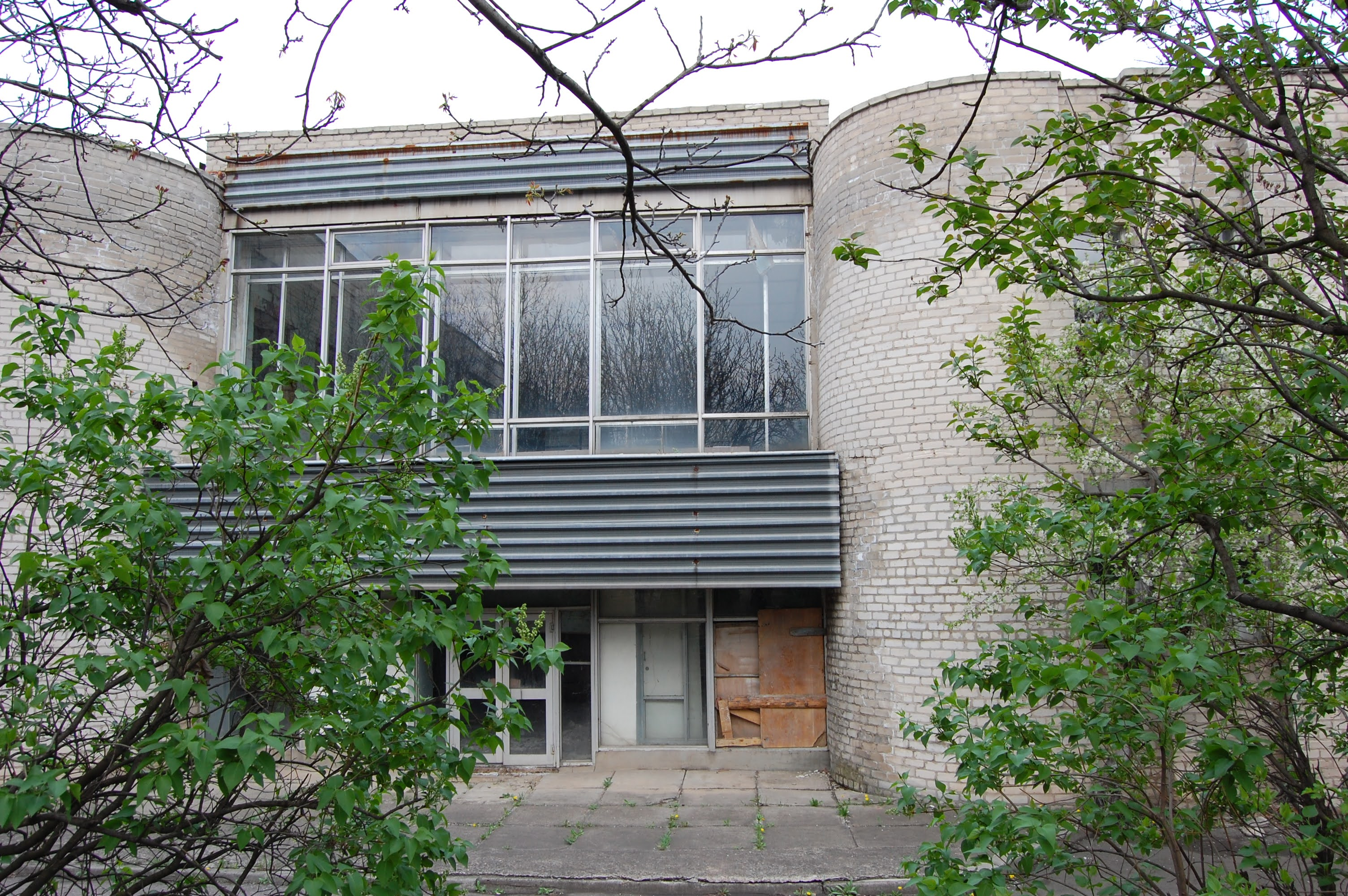
The disused indoor swimming pool, another view

== See also ==
- Ocheretyne
- Ocheretyne settlement hromada
- Battle of Pokrovsk
- List of cultural and educational property destroyed during the Russo-Ukrainian War
- Education in Ukraine
