= Battle of Ocheretyne =

2024 battle in the Russo-Ukrainian war

- Part of the eastern front of the Russo-Ukrainian war (2022–present)
Date	16 April 2024 – 28 April 2024 (1 week and 5 days)
Location	Ocheretyne, Donetsk Oblast, Ukraine
Result	Russian victory
Territorial changes	Russian forces capture Ocheretyne and surroundings

Belligerents
Russia	Ukraine

Units involved
15th Separate Guards Motor Rifle Brigade; 30th Motor Rifle Brigade; 55th Mountain Motor Rifle Brigade; 74th Separate Guards Motor Rifle Brigade; 90th Guards Tank Division	3rd Assault Brigade; 23rd Mechanized Brigade; 25th Airborne Brigade; 47th Mechanized Brigade; 100th Mechanized Brigade; 115th Mechanized Brigade

Strength
10,000	3,000

Casualties and losses
Unknown	Heavy

A battle took place in and around the village of Ocheretyne, Donetsk Oblast, in April 2024, during the Russo-Ukrainian war, resulting in the capture of the village by Russia.

== Background ==
Ocheretyne is a Ukrainian settlement in Donetsk Oblast located near the strategically important H20 highway. It is located 15 km north of central Avdiivka and about 35 km north-northwest of Donetsk city, the capital of the self-proclaimed Donetsk People's Republic. Ocheretyne had a population of around 3,000 residents prior to the 2022 Russian invasion of Ukraine.

== Battle ==
On 16 April 2024, Russian forces advanced towards the settlement, and fighting over the settlement began. According to Forbes journalist David Axe, Russian troops numbered 10,000, including soldiers from the 15th Separate Guards Motor Rifle Brigade, 30th Motor Rifle Brigade, 74th Separate Guards Motor Rifle Brigade, elements of the 90th Guards Tank Division and special forces units. Meanwhile, Ukrainian troops numbered only 3,000, including soldiers from the 23rd, 47th, 100th and 115th Mechanized Brigades, the 25th Airborne Brigade, the 3rd Assault Brigade and the 425th Assault Battalion. The 115th Mechanised Brigade arrived in Ocheretyne in April 2024. According to Mykola Melnyk, a well-known company commander in the 47th Mechanized Brigade, the 115th Mechanised Brigade left their positions without permission, which led to a breakthrough by Russian forces within 48 hours. On 23rd April 2024, Ukrainian media reported that the army's leadership in Kyiv had launched an investigation to find out the reason for the 115th Mechanized Brigade's unauthorized leave. On 23 April, Nazar Voloshyn, the spokesperson for Ukraine's Khortytsia Group of Forces claimed that Russian forces were using chemical weapons. However, Voloshyn did not specify what type of chemical weapons were being used.

On 23 April 2024, Russian milblogers claimed that Russian forces have captured the settlement. Later that day, the Ukrainians denied this, and claimed that while Russian troops had entered the village, it remained contested. They also claimed to have killed or wounded 20 Russian soldiers and destroyed seven armored vehicles in a strike the previous day. On 26 April, Voloshyn claimed that Ukraine still controlled two-thirds of Ocheretyne. He also claimed that Russian forces brought in additional reserves from the 55th Mountain Motor Rifle Brigade to break through the Ukrainian defenses. On 27 April, a speaker of the Ukrainian defense forces stated that Ocheretyne was only partially captured by Russian troops and battles were ongoing.

On 28 April 2024, The Guardian reported that Russian forces captured Ocheretyne and overran Soloviove and Novokalynove. The Russian Ministry of Defence confirmed the capture of Ocheretyne on 5 May 2024. Ukrainian officials did not immediately comment on the status of Ocheretyne, and the settlement was not mentioned in the daily field report.

== Aftermath ==
The capture of Ocheretyne provided Russian forces the local high ground north of Avdiivka, allowing for further advances northwards and westwards into Donetsk Oblast, and a potential flanking advance west of the Toretsk-New York agglomeration.

After establishing a foothold in Ocheretyne, Russian forces expanded the buffer zone south of the salient, capturing the villages of Novobakhmutivka and Soloviove in quick succession by 1 May. Russian troops also advanced west of Ocheretyne, with clashes reported along the Novooleksandrivka-Sokil direction on 3 May. The Russians were also advancing on a separate axis east of Ocheretyne, capturing Novokalynove and Keramik by 30 April, according to DeepStateMap.Live. After capturing Ocheretyne and Keramik, the Russians further advanced northwards and captured Arkhanhelske by 5 May, according to DeepState.

The capture of Ocheretyne and surrounding villages allowed Russian forces to begin pushing west towards the Ukrainian logistical hub of Pokrovsk, with a concerted offensive underway by 18 July 2024. Per the Institute for the Study of War, the offensive was completed by January 2026, with Russian forces capturing several cities.

== Analysis ==
According to DeepStateMap.Live, the capture of Ocheretyne was the fastest penetration into Ukrainian territory by Russian forces in recent months. The capture of at least parts of the village was attributed to a rotational error by Ukrainian military commanders that left the sector mostly undefended and led to Russian forces advancing five kilometers. Some observers blamed the 115th Mechanized Brigade, which had recently rotated into positions in Ocheretyne and was almost immediately overwhelmed by the Russian army's 30th Motor Rifle Brigade. DeepStateMap claimed in a Telegram post that the leadership of the 115th Mechanized Brigade was "responsible for the collapse of the defense in the entire sector, allowing significant losses". Other observers blamed recent delays in American military aid.

== See also ==
- List of military engagements during the Russian invasion of Ukraine
