= 115th Mechanized Brigade (Ukraine) =

Ukrainian Ground Forces unit

- 115-та окрема механізована бригада
- Shoulder Sleeve Insignia
- Active: March 1, 2022 - present
- Country: Ukraine
- Branch: Ukrainian Ground Forces
- Role: Mechanized Infantry
- Part of: 10th Army Corps
- Garrison/HQ: Cherkasy Oblast
- Mottos: Народжені вогнем (English: Born of fire)
- Engagements: Russian invasion of Ukraine: Battle of Sievierodonetsk; Battle of Lysychansk; Battle of Marinka; Battle of Avdiivka; Battle of Ocheretyne; Pokrovsk offensive; 2024 Kursk offensive
- Website: https://www.facebook.com/115ombr

Commanders
- Current commander: Ihor Ivanov

Insignia
- Subdued patch

The 115th Mechanised Brigade (Ukrainian: 115-та окрема механізована бригада) is a brigade of the Ukrainian Ground Forces formed in 2022.

== History ==
The brigade was created at the beginning of March 2022 during the first weeks of the Russian invasion of Ukraine in the village of Blahodatne in Cherkasy Oblast. On April 3, its first deployment for a combat mission started in Kreminna, then from May to July the brigade fought in Sievierodonetsk and Lysychansk, Siversk, Marinka and Avdiivka.

During the Ukrainian counter-offensive in September 2022, the 115th Brigade was garrisoned in Severodonetsk, and engaged in urban warfare fighting block by block. There were questions about Brigades readiness and ability to hold positions in Sievierodonetsk.

During the Battle of Karkhiv, the 115th Mechanised Brigade was noted for their role as a successful ground unit used during combined arms attacks.

Debate arose about the efficacy of the Brigade in the Battle of Ocheretyne in April 2024. The 115th Mechanised Brigade had arrived at the small town of Ocheretyne to secure the village despite numerical superiority of Russian troops. According to Mykola Melnyk, a 47th Mechanized Brigade company commander, soldiers from the 115th left their positions without permission, which led to a breakthrough by the Russians within 48 hours. The story was then picked up and amplified by Russian state media.

Ukrainian media reported on 23 April 2024 that the army leadership in Kyiv had launched an investigation into the Battle of Ocheretyne. On 2 May 2024, the brigade denied responsibility for the defeat at the Battle of Ocheretyne with the press service of the brigade going onto say that: "The accusations made by Roman Pohorily (the founder of DeepStateMap.Live) are false. Who is guilty or not guilty is determined exclusively by the commission based on the results of the investigation." The brigade later claimed that it had killed "a huge number of Russian troops" and "firmly stated" that "no regular unit of the 115th Brigade of the Armed Forces of Ukraine abandoned their positions and fled, as claimed by Russian media, but heroically held the defence." The brigade also accused Deepstate and its founder Roman Pohorily, of "defaming the honor and dignity of the 115th Mechanized Brigade, as well as devaluing the lives of fallen soldiers."

== Structure ==
As of 2024 the brigade's structure is as follows:

- 115th Mechanized Brigade, Cherkasy Oblast
  - Headquarters & Headquarters Company
  - 1st Mechanized Battalion
  - 2nd Mechanized Battalion
  - 3rd Mechanized Battalion
- 20th Separate Rifle Battalion (A7104)
- 44th Separate Rifle Battalion (A4049)
  - Tank Battalion
  - Anti-Tank Guided Missiles Artillery Battery
  - Anti-Aircraft Artillery Battery
  - Anti-Tank Artillery Battery
  - Artillery Division
  - Sniper Platoon
  - Reconnaissance Company
  - 37th Reserve Company
  - Engineer Battalion
  - Logistic Battalion
  - Signal Company
  - Maintenance Battalion
  - Radar Company
  - Medical Company
  - CBRN Protection Company
