= Novobakhmutivka =

Novobakhmutivka (Ukrainian: Новобахмутівка) may refer to one of the following locations in Ukraine:

== Villages ==
- Novobakhmutivka, Novobakhmut village council, Ocheretyne settlement hromada, Pokrovsk Raion, Donetsk Oblast
- Novobakhmutivka, Solovyiv village council, Ocheretyne settlement hromada, Pokrovsk Raion, Donetsk Oblast

== Railway ==
- Novobakhmutivka station, a railway station of the Krasno-Lyman Directorate of the Donets Railway
