= Ocheretyne =

Urban locality in Donetsk Oblast, Ukraine

Ocheretyne Очеретине
- Rural settlement
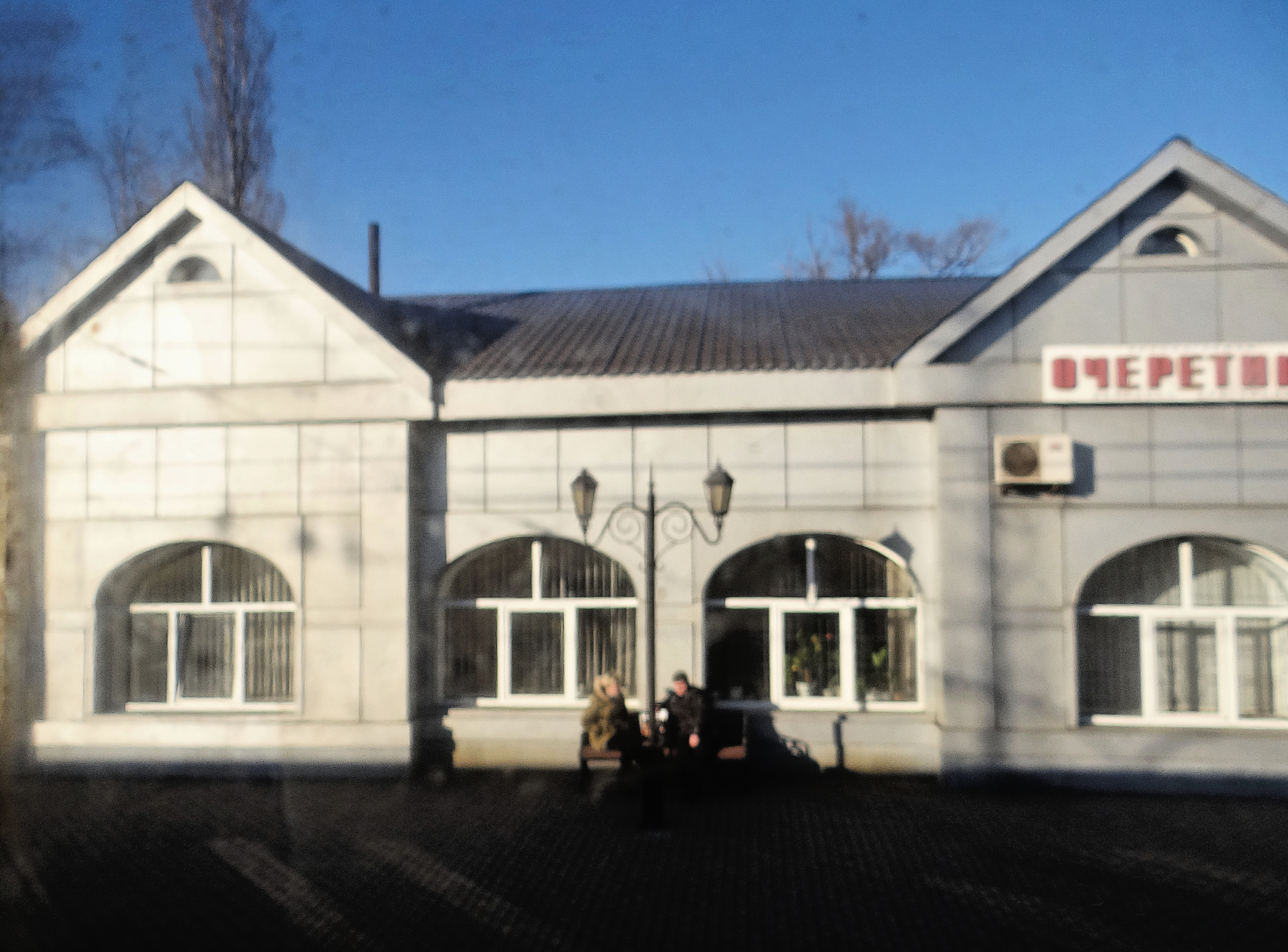
- Ocheretyne railway station
- Interactive map of Ocheretyne
- Location within Donetsk Oblast Location within Ukraine
- Coordinates: 48°14′34″N 37°36′38″E
- Country: Ukraine
- Oblast: Donetsk Oblast
- Raion: Pokrovsk Raion
- Hromada: Ocheretyne settlement hromada
- Founded: 1880

Population (2022)
  - Total: 3,378
- Time zone: UTC+2 (EET)
  - Summer (DST): UTC+3 (EEST)

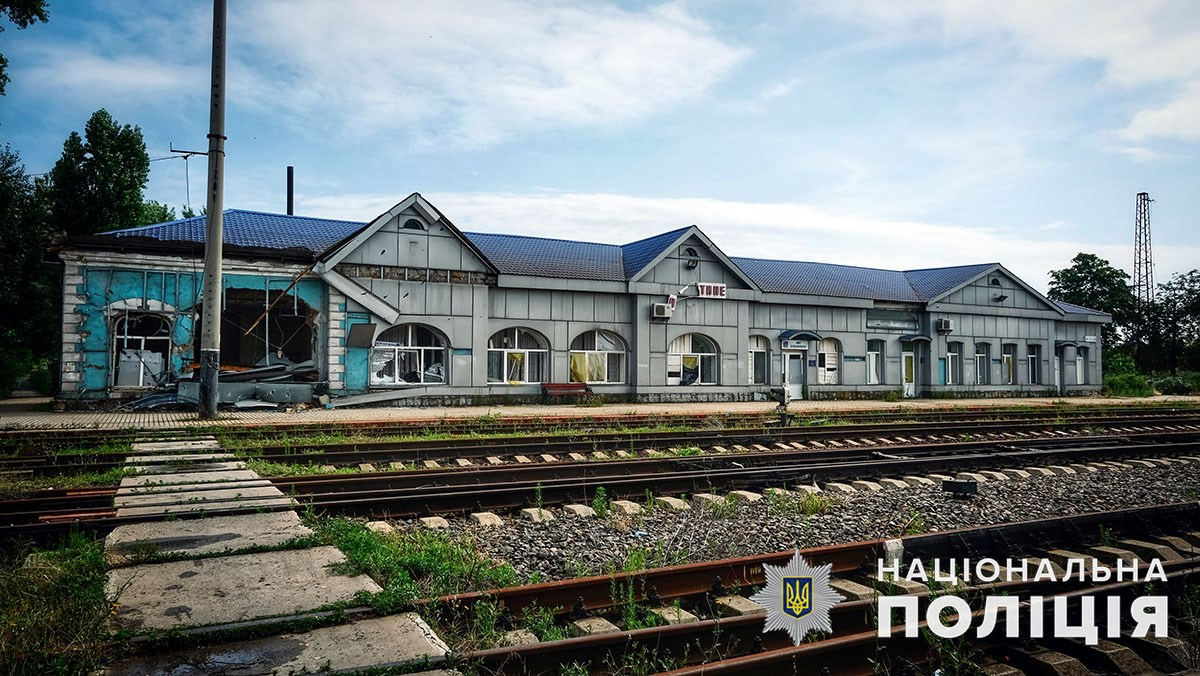
Ocheretyne Train Station

Ocheretyne (Ukrainian: Очеретине) is a rural settlement in Pokrovsk Raion, Donetsk Oblast, eastern Ukraine. It serves as the administrative center of Ocheretyne settlement hromada. Its population is approximately 3,378 (2022 estimate). Since April 2024, it has been temporarily occupied by Russia, and the settlement has been largely destroyed in the fighting.

== History ==
Ocheretyne was founded in 1880 in connection with constructing a railway and the Ocheretyne station.

169 villagers fought against Nazi German soldiers on the fronts of World War II, of whom 78 died on the battlefield, and 121 were awarded orders and medals. Two monuments were erected on the graves of soldiers who died during the liberation of the village from Nazi occupation. A memorial plaque was also erected in honor of them.

On 9 December 2014, following the events surrounding the War in Donbas, the Verkhovna Rada, Ukraine's national parliament, moved Yasynuvata Raion's administration buildings and government to вул. Першотравнева 12, (English: 12 May Day Street) in Ocheretyne, which is near the H20 highway, about 35 km north-northwest of Donetsk. As a result, Ocheretyne was the de facto administrative center of the raion until it was abolished on 18 July 2020 as part of the administrative reform of Ukraine, which reduced the number of raions of Donetsk Oblast to eight, of which only five were controlled by the government.

=== Battle of Ocheretyne ===
During the Russian invasion of Ukraine, Russian military forces captured the city of Avdiivka on 17 February 2024, located southeast of Ocheretyne. On 14–16 April 2024, Russian forces advanced northwards towards Ocheretyne, resulting in a two week-long battle. Quickly entering from the southern direction, intense clashes were reported ongoing near the train station on 21 April, with Russia controlling more than 30% of the settlement by 22 April after Ukraine's 115th Mechanized Brigade reportedly fled their front line positions without permission. Despite the 47th Mechanized Brigade deploying reserves in the area, Ocheretyne was reportedly captured by Russian forces on 28 April 2024. The capture of the village was attributed to a rotational error by Ukrainian military commanders that left the sector mostly undefended and led to Russian forces advancing five kilometers.

The Russian Ministry of Defence confirmed the capture of Ocheretyne on 5 May 2024.

== Education ==
The settlement's public general-education school, Ocheretyne School, occupied a multi-storey Soviet-era building in the centre of Ocheretyne and was renovated in 2015. An adjacent indoor swimming pool, built during the Soviet period, operated until 1995. Both the school building and the disused pool were destroyed during the fighting and subsequent temporary Russian occupation of the settlement in 2024.

== Demographics ==
Native language as of the Ukrainian Census of 2001:

- Russian 54.52%
- Ukrainian 44.67%
- Armenian 0.25%
- Romani 0.22%
- German 0.07%
- Belarusian 0.05%
- Polish and Romanian 0.02%
