= Mikoyan-Gurevich I-211 =

Prototype Soviet high-altitude fighter aircraft

I-211
- Side view of the I-211

General information
- Type: Fighter aircraft
- National origin: Soviet Union
- Manufacturer: Mikoyan-Gurevich
- Status: Prototype
- Primary user: Soviet Air Forces
- Number built: 1

History
- First flight: 12 February 1943
- Developed from: Mikoyan-Gurevich I-210

The Mikoyan-Gurevich I-211 was a prototype high-altitude Soviet fighter aircraft built during World War II. It was a version of the Mikoyan-Gurevich I-210, itself a variant of the Mikoyan-Gurevich MiG-3, fitted with a Shvetsov ASh-82F radial engine. Its development was quite prolonged, although successful, but by the time it finished its manufacturer's trials in early 1944 there was no need for a high-altitude fighter and it was not worth reducing the production of existing fighters to convert a factory over to the I-211.

== Development ==
The I-211 was a direct descendant of the Mikoyan-Gurevich I-210 high-altitude fighter prototype, also known as the MiG-3-82 or MiG-9. Late in 1941, a decision was made to phase out production of the Mikulin AM-35A engine used by the MiG-1 and MiG-3 in favor of the Mikulin AM-38 engine used in the Ilyushin Il-2. The MiG design team had already created a version of the MiG-3 called the I-210, using a Shvetsov ASh-82 radial engine instead of the inline, liquid-cooled engine. A number of changes were made in order to accommodate the larger circumference of the radial engine, but the redesign of the engine cowling was a failure and the I-210 proved to be slower than the Yak-1 or the LaGG-3 when it first flew on 23 July 1941.

Artem Mikoyan and Mikhail Gurevich continued development and another prototype was built, the MiG I-211, or the MiG-9Ye, using the improved ASh-82F engine. Improvements from the I-210 included aerodynamic refinements of the engine cowling, the cockpit was moved aft 24.5 cm (9.6 in), the oil cooler inlets were moved to the wing roots, the oil cooler was moved entirely inside fuselage and a larger tail was fitted. It was armed with two 20 mm (0.79 in) ShVAK cannon. It weighed some 300 kg (660 lb) less than the I-210, possibly due to an all-metal structure, but this cannot be confirmed. These refinements took most of 1942 to design and assembly of the I-211 did not begin until December 1942. Its first flight was on 24 February 1943. The reduction in drag and in weight greatly improved performance over the I-211, with a top speed of 670 km/h (420 mph) at a height of 7,000 m (23,000 ft) and it took only 4.0 minutes to reach an altitude of 5,000 m (16,000 ft). The OKB had originally planned to build ten in the first quarter of 1943, but the manufacturer's trials took an unexpectedly long time to complete and were not finished until the first quarter of 1944. By this time there was little demand for a high-altitude fighter and the project was canceled with only a single aircraft built.

=== Nomenclature ===
In a number of older books, the MiG I-211 is called the MiG-5. It is now established that the MiG-5 designation was reserved for the production version of the MiG DIS, a twin-engine fighter that did not enter production. The acronym DIS comes from Dalnij Istrebitel Soprovozhdenya or long-range escort fighter. Similarly, the MiG-9 designation was intended for the production version of the MiG-3 with the ASh-82 radial engine. This name was reused shortly afterwards for the first Mikoyan-Gurevich jet fighter.

== Operators ==
Soviet Union

- Soviet Air Force

== Specifications (I-211) ==
Data from Soviet Air Power in World War 2; and Mikoyan's Piston-engined Fighters

General characteristics

- Crew: 1
- Length: 7.954 m (26 ft 1 in)
- Wingspan: 10.2 m (33 ft 6 in)
- Height: 3.63 m (11 ft 11 in)
- Wing area: 17.44 m^{2} (187.7 sq ft)
- Empty weight: 2,590 kg (5,710 lb)
- Gross weight: 3,070 kg (6,768 lb)
- Powerplant: 1 × Shvetsov M-82F 14-cylinder air-cooled radial piston engine, 1,362 kW (1,826 hp) for take-off
- Propellers: 3-bladed constant-speed propeller

Performance

- Maximum speed: 670 km/h (420 mph, 360 kn) at 7,100 m (23,300 ft)
- Range: 940 km (580 mi, 510 nmi)
- Service ceiling: 11,300 m (37,100 ft)
- Time to altitude: 5,000 m (16,000 ft) in 4 minutes

Armament

- Guns: 2 × forward-firing 20 mm ShVAK autocannon mounted on the bottom of the engine cowling
