= Mikoyan-Gurevich MiG-1 =

1940 fighter aircraft model by Mikoyan-Gurevich

MiG-1
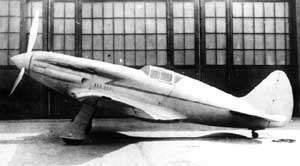

General information
- Type: Fighter aircraft
- National origin: Soviet Union
- Manufacturer: Mikoyan-Gurevich
- Primary user: Soviet Air Forces (VVS)
- Number built: 100 + 3 prototypes

History
- Manufactured: 1940
- First flight: 5 April 1940
- Retired: 1944
- Variant: Mikoyan-Gurevich MiG-3

The Mikoyan-Gurevich MiG-1 (Russian: Микоян-Гуревич МиГ-1) was a Soviet fighter aircraft of World War II that was designed to meet a requirement for a high-altitude fighter issued in 1939. To minimize demand on strategic materials such as aluminum, the aircraft was mostly constructed from steel tubing and wood. Flight testing revealed a number of deficiencies, but it was ordered into production before they could be fixed. Although difficult to handle, one hundred were built before the design was modified into the MiG-3. The aircraft was issued to fighter regiments of the Soviet Air Forces (VVS) in 1941, but most were destroyed during the opening days of Operation Barbarossa, the German invasion of the Soviet Union in June 1941.

== Design and development ==
=== Design phase ===
The MiG-1 was designed in response to a requirement for a high-altitude fighter with an inline engine issued by the VVS in January 1939. Initially the aircraft, designated I-200, was designed in the Polikarpov construction bureau. Work started in June 1939, under the direction of Nikolai Polikarpov and his assistant M. Tetivikin. Polikarpov himself preferred radial engines and promoted his I-180 design at that time, but when the powerful Mikulin AM-37 inline engine became available, he decided to use it in a fighter. The approach that he selected was to build the smallest possible aircraft around the intended powerplant, thereby minimizing weight and drag — the philosophy of the light fighter. As specified, the aircraft was to be capable of reaching 670 km/h (417 mph). In August 1939, Polikarpov fell out of favor with Joseph Stalin and as a result, when Polikarpov went in November 1939 to tour Germany's aviation works, the Soviet authorities decided to scatter his construction team and create a new Experimental Construction Section (OKO), headed by Artem Mikoyan and Mikhail Gurevich, which remained formally subordinated to the Polikarpov bureau until June 1940. Further work upon the I-200 design was assigned to Mikoyan and Gurevich, who later became recognized — not with full justice — as its designers.

The MiG-1 was a low-wing monoplane with a tailwheel undercarriage of mixed construction. Due to shortages of light alloys, the rear fuselage was made from wood, but the front fuselage, from the propeller to the rear of the cockpit, was a welded steel tube truss covered by duralumin. The bulk of the wing was wooden, but the center section was all-metal with a steel I-section main spar. The wing used a Clark YH profile. It was evenly tapered with rounded tips and the outer wing panels had 5° of dihedral. All three landing gear wheels retracted hydraulically; the main units inwards into the wing center section. The cockpit was situated well aft, which seriously limited forward vision when landing and taxiing. The AM-37 engine was not yet available and the less powerful V-12 Mikulin AM-35A had to be substituted. It had six exhaust ejectors, one for each pair of cylinders, that provided some additional thrust. It drove a VISh-22Ye controllable-pitch propeller 3 metres (9.8 ft) in diameter. The air intakes for the supercharger were in the wing roots and the oil cooler was on the port side of the engine cowling. The radiator was underneath the cockpit. Armament included two fuselage-mounted 7.62 mm (0.300 in) ShKAS machine guns and one 12.7 mm (0.50 in) UBS machine gun.

The result was a highly conventional aircraft that first flew on schedule on 5 April 1940 at the Khodynka Aerodrome in Moscow with chief test pilot Arkadij Ekatov at the controls. On 24 May the first prototype attained a speed of 648.5 km/h (402.9 mph) at 6,900 m (22,638 ft). It could not, however, attain the speed originally specified by the Air Force with this engine. The second prototype took to the air on 9 May, but the third aircraft, the first to be armed, was forced to wait until 6 June, as problems with its synchronization gear prolonged the ground firing tests. On 5 August 651 km/h (405 mph) was reached at 7,000 m (23,000 ft) using maximum boost. Time to altitude figures were 5.1 minutes to 5,000 m (16,000 ft) and 7.2 minutes to 7,000 m (23,000 ft) and speeds at lower altitudes were 579 km/h (360 mph) at 2,200 m (7,200 ft) and 605 km/h (376 mph) at 3,630 m (11,910 ft).

=== Production and improvements ===
The I-200 was ordered into production almost immediately, on 31 May 1940. In contrast to the other competing designs, the I-26 (Yak-1) and I-301 (LaGG-3), the I-200 successfully completed the state trials in August on its first attempt. But the trials revealed a number of serious defects, including inadequate visibility when taxiing, poor-quality plexiglas in the canopy obscuring the pilot's view, heavy controls, poor longitudinal stability, difficulty in opening the canopy, an excessively hot cockpit and a "dangerous propensity to flick from a simple stall into a spin from which it was almost impossible to recover".

A number of improvements were ordered to be made to the aircraft as a result of the deficiencies discovered during the trials, but only a few of them were able to be implemented before production began as the VVS was very anxious to get modern fighters into service. These included an additional air intake on the starboard side of the nose for the oil cooler, rubber sheaths around the fuel tanks to make them self-sealing, two underwing bomb racks each capable of carrying a 100-kilogram (220 lb) FAB-100 bomb, a PBP-1 gunsight and each ShKAS was given 375 rounds and the UBS 300 rounds. From the ninth aircraft onwards the side-opening canopy was replaced by a rear-sliding canopy that could be jettisoned in flight. On 9 December 1940 the first 100 I-200s were designated as the MiG-1 (after the initials of Mikoyan and Gurevich).

The improvement process continued throughout the production run, though they were not immediately implemented in the production line, but were instead incorporated in a fourth prototype for evaluation. This aircraft first flew on 29 October 1940 and was a significant improvement over the I-200s then in production. It passed its State acceptance trials and its improvements were incorporated in the production line from the 101st I-200. These were designated as the MiG-3 on 9 December, although the first production MiG-3 was not completed until 20 December 1940.

=== Additional testing ===
The I-200 prototypes were used to evaluate a number of proposals. For example, the second prototype was fitted with a prototype of the AM-37 engine and first flew with that engine on 6 January 1941. It experienced severe vibration problems and, despite efforts to cure the problems, failed during a flight on 7 May, and was destroyed in the ensuing crash. The third prototype was generally used for armament trials, experimenting with 82 mm (3.2 in) RS-82 rockets among other weapons. For another trial it was equipped with the experimental 23 mm (0.91 in) MP-3 autocannon carried underneath the wings in external pods and redesignated as the IP-201. The 12.7 mm UBS gun was removed for these tests and the space freed up was used to install an extra fuel tank. Initially the cannon had the low rate of fire of only 300 rounds per minute, but this was soon doubled and the gun was renamed the MP-6. Installation of the guns was difficult, despite the aircraft's metal outer wing panels, and the wings deformed when the cannon were first mounted. It made its first and only flight on 1 December 1940 carrying two MP-6s and two 12.7 mm AP-12.7 machine guns, but a blocked fuel line caused a forced landing before the guns could be fired. Testing on a variety of other aircraft revealed very unsatisfactory performance from the guns and their development was canceled. The designers were arrested on 15 May 1941 and executed on 28 October 1941.

== Operational history ==
On 3 December 1940 the VVS ordered that the 41st Fighter Regiment (istrebitel'nyy aviatsionnyy polk), based at the Crimean town of Kacha, was to conduct operational trials on the I-200 and that they were to be transferred to the 146th Fighter Regiment at Yevpatoria, also in the Crimea, for pilot training after the conclusion of the trials. By 22 February 1941, 89 had been issued to regular fighter units, notably the 89th Fighter Regiment at Kaunas, Lithuania and the 41st Fighter Regiment at Białystok, Poland, both places under Soviet occupation since 1939–40. On 1 June 1941 they were spread out a bit more, with 31 in the Baltic Military District, 37 in the Western Special Military District, one in the Kiev Military District and eight in the Odessa Military District for a total of 77 on hand, of which only 55 were operational. An additional eight MiG-1s were assigned to the Soviet Navy. However, only four pilots were trained to handle either the MiG-1 or the MiG-3.

Little is known of the performance of the MiG-1 in combat as most were likely destroyed during the opening days of Operation Barbarossa. However, one was still in the inventory of the VVS as late as 1944 when it was recorded as withdrawn that year.

== Variants ==
- Samolet Kh (Самолет Х): Internal OKB "aircraft" designation of the I-200 prototype.
- Izdeliye-61: Internal OKB "product" designation of the I-200 prototype.
- I-200: MiG-1 prototype, three made.
- MiG-1: Single-seat interceptor fighter aircraft for the Soviet Air Force.

== Operators ==
Soviet Union

- Soviet Air Forces (VVS)
- Soviet Navy

== Specifications (MiG-1) ==
Data from

General characteristics

- Crew: 1
- Length: 8.155 m (26 ft 9 in)
- Wingspan: 10.2 m (33 ft 6 in)
- Height: 2.62 m (8 ft 7 in)
- Wing area: 17.44 m^{2} (187.7 sq ft)
- Airfoil: root: Clark YH (14%); tip: Clark YH (8%)
- Empty weight: 2,602 kg (5,736 lb)
- Gross weight: 3,099 kg (6,832 lb)
- Max takeoff weight: 3,319 kg (7,317 lb)
- Powerplant: 1 × Mikulin AM-35A V-12 liquid-cooled piston engine, 1,007 kW (1,350 hp) reduction gear:0.902
- Propellers: 3-bladed variable-pitch propeller VISH-22E, 24-44°, 3.0 m (9 ft 10 in) diameter

Performance

- Maximum speed: 628–636 km/h (390–395 mph, 339–343 kn)
- Stall speed: 180–190 km/h (110–120 mph, 97–103 kn)
- Never exceed speed: 630 km/h (390 mph, 340 kn)
- Range: 580 km (360 mi, 310 nmi) Vmax 0.9
- Service ceiling: 12,000 m (39,000 ft)
- Rate of climb: 16.8 m/s (3,310 ft/min)
- Wing loading: 177.7 kg/m^{2} (36.4 lb/sq ft)
- Power/mass: 0.32 kW/kg (0.19 hp/lb)

Armament

- Guns:

- 1 × 12.7 mm Berezin UB synchronized machine gun mounted in upper nose cowling
- 2 × 7.62 mm ShKAS synchronized machine guns mounted in upper nose cowling

== See also ==
Related development

- I-185
- Polikarpov ITP
- MiG-3
- MiG-7
- I-210
- I-220
- I-230

Aircraft of comparable role, configuration, and era

- Curtiss XP-37
- Heinkel He 100
- LaGG-3
- Yakovlev Yak-1

Related lists

- List of military aircraft of the Soviet Union and the CIS
- List of fighter aircraft
- List of aircraft of World War II
