= Mikoyan-Gurevich I-220 =

Prototype Soviet high-altitude fighter aircraft

I-220
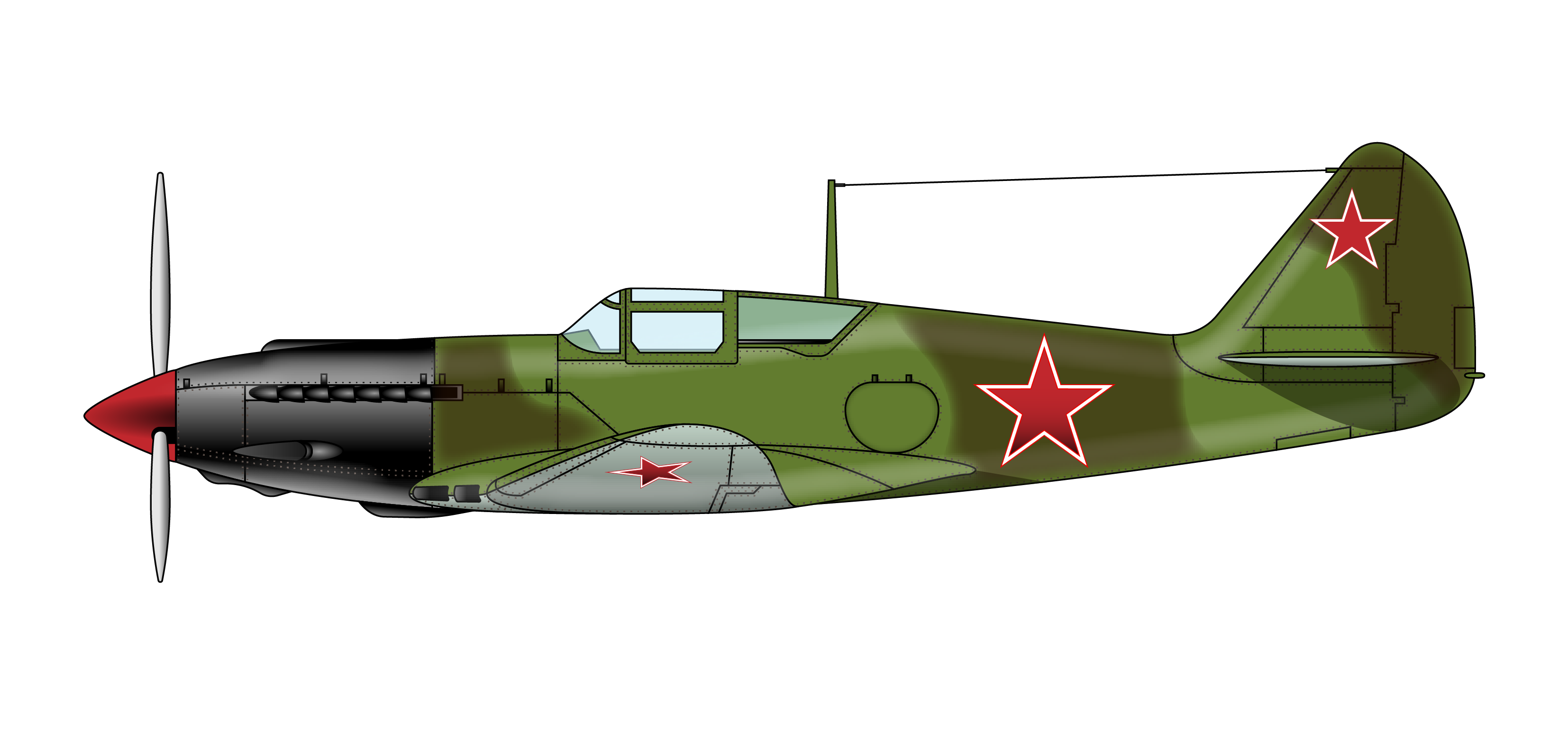
- Drawing of the I-220

General information
- Type: Fighter aircraft
- National origin: Soviet Union
- Manufacturer: Mikoyan-Gurevich
- Status: Prototype
- Primary user: Soviet Air Forces
- Number built: 7

History
- First flight: July 1943

The Mikoyan-Gurevich I-220 was a prototype high-altitude fighter aircraft built in the Soviet Union during World War II. It is originally developed to counter the threat of German high-altitude reconnaissance aircraft, a total of seven prototypes were built and tested across five variants. By 1944, the threat of German high-altitude aircraft had subsided, and production of the I-220 and its variants was seen as unnecessary.

== Design and development ==
In early 1941, the Soviet Union issued a requirement for a new high-altitude fighter aircraft to counter enemy high-altitude reconnaissance aircraft such as the Junkers Ju 86. However, it was not until late 1942 that a contract for two prototypes was placed with the Mikoyan and Gurevich OKB, which began work on Samolyot A (Aircraft A). Samolyot A, designated I-220 by the People's Commissariat of Aviation Industry (NKAP), was of an entirely new design of primarily shpon (wood veneer) construction with a steel-tube truss engine mount and a light-alloy tail. The wing's airfoil was of a CAHI laminar-flow type, and the wing was fitted with leading-edge slat and split flaps. All air inlets were located in the leading edge of the wing near the wing roots. The tail was of a similar design to that of the I-230 but with a slightly increased tailplane span. Power was provided by a 1,104 kW (1,480 hp) Mikulin AM-39 engine, though the first prototype was originally powered by a 1,104 kW (1,480 hp) Mikulin AM-38F driving a three-bladed AV-5A propeller. The aircraft featured conventional landing gear with inward-retracting main gear and a retractable tailwheel. Fuel was provided by six self-sealing tanks made of rubberized fabric with two in the fuselage and four in the wings. The cockpit seated a single pilot under a sliding canopy and was designed to eventually be pressurized, though a pressurization system was never fitted. Armament was to be four ShVAK autocannons, each with 150 rounds, with two located above the engine and two beside the crankcase. Only the two cannons above the engine were fitted on the first prototype, though the lower gun ports were not faired over.

With overflights of Ju 86R reconnaissance aircraft still being a problem in the summer of 1942, work began on an I-220 variant with improved performance in the stratosphere. Designated I-221, or Samolyot 2A, the aircraft had a redesigned wing with an increased span and a NACA-234 airfoil. The outer wings and rear fuselage were of all-metal construction. Power was provided by a 1,251 kW (1,678 hp) Mikulin AM-39A turbo-supercharged engine driving a three-bladed propeller. The number of turbo-superchargers fitted to their aircraft is unclear, with some published descriptions of the I-221 stating that there were two TK-2B turbo-superchargers while the MiG OKB design drawing showed only a single TK-2B unit mounted on the right side of the cowling. The I-221 was the first MiG aircraft to feature a pressurized cockpit, which was air conditioned with cooling provided by a heat exchanger housed in an air duct underneath the fuselage. Fuel capacity was increased from that of the I-220, but by how much is unknown. The upper pair of ShVAK cannons were deleted on the I-221, leaving only the two cannons mounted beside the engine with 150 rounds each.

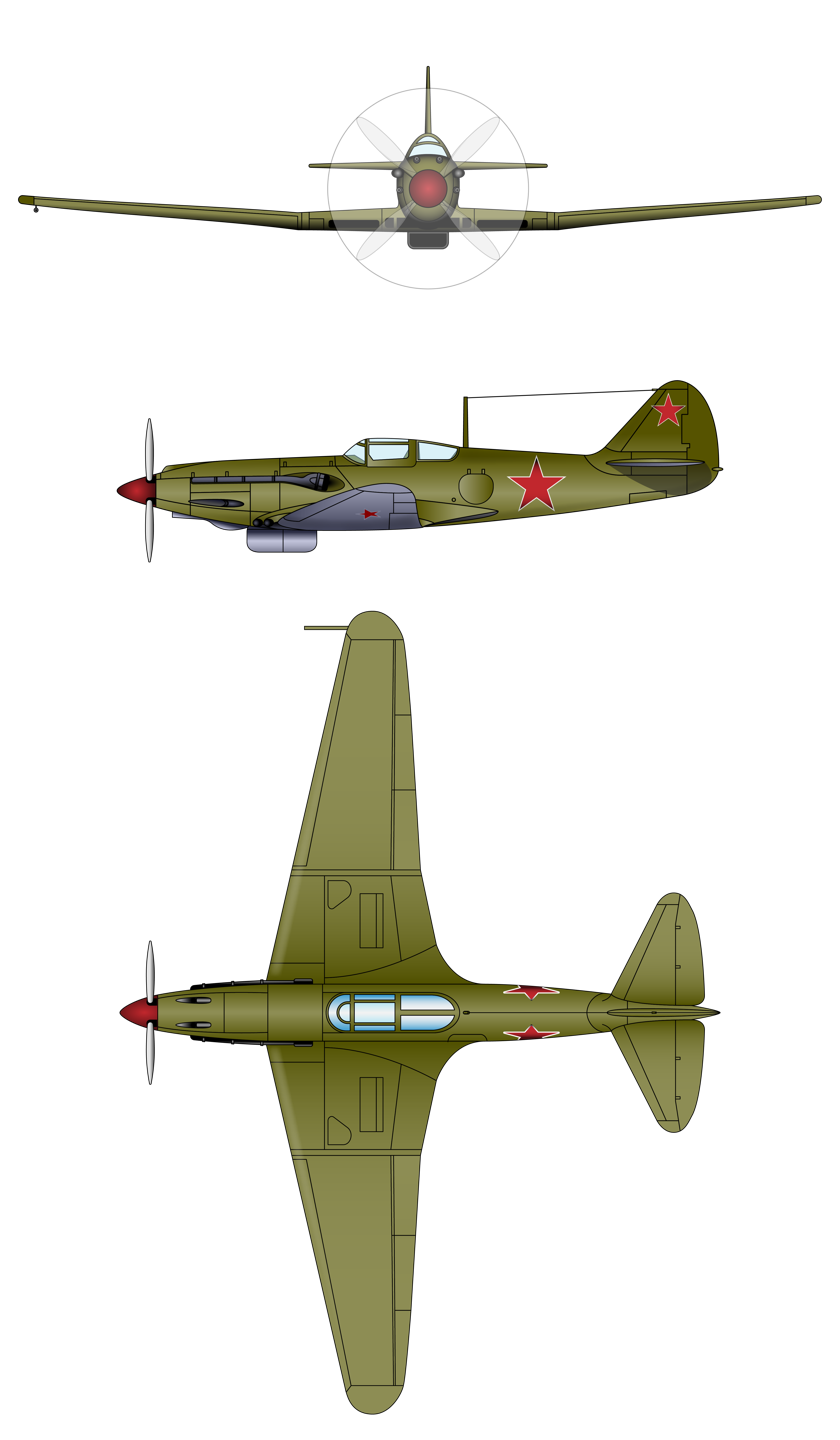
Three-view drawing of the I-222

The I-222, or Samolyot 3A, was similar to the I-221, but was powered by a 1,104 kW (1,480 hp) Mikulin AM-39B-1 engine with a single TK-300B turbo-supercharger on the left side of the cowling. The engine originally drove a three-bladed AV-5A propeller, but this was later replaced by a four-bladed AV-9L-26 unit. An intercooler for the turbo-supercharger was housed in a deep air duct underneath the fuselage near the leading edge of the wing. The outer wings and rear fuselage reverted to wooden construction, with the rear fuselage also being slightly lowered to improve rear visibility. Like the I-221, the I-222's cockpit was pressurized and air conditioned. Unlike the I-221, however, it was fitted with a bulletproof windscreen and bulletproof glass behind the pilot's head, all 64 mm (2.5 in) thick, and 8 or 9 mm armor plates were added to the pressure bulkhead. The sliding canopy was reinforced with a heavy metal frame which reduced visibility, and fuel capacity was reduced by removing the fuselage tanks. Armament was the same as on the I-221, but with ammunition reduced to 80 rounds per gun.

The I-224, or Samolyot 4A, was similar to the I-222, but with several changes including moving the TK-300B turbo-supercharger to the right side and the pressurized cockpit changed to welded aluminum alloy construction instead of wood. The aircraft was powered by a 1,052 kW (1,411 hp) Mikulin AM-39B engine driving a four-bladed AV-9L-22B propeller, and the intercooler air duct was made deeper. Fuel capacity was increased, as was ammunition with 100 rounds per cannon.

The final development of Samolyot A was the I-225, or Samolyot 5A, which was based on the original I-220, though unlike the previous variants it was not intended for high-altitude fighting. Powered by a 1,750 hp (1,300 kW) Mikulin AM-42B engine driving a three-bladed AV-5A-22V propeller, and the underside of the cowling was deeper. The wings and pressurized cockpit were of all-metal construction, and the cockpit had improved instruments and controls. The cockpit was also armored with a 64 mm (2.5 in) thick bulletproof windscreen, a rear glass slab of the same thickness, and a seat with 9 mm (0.35 in) armor plating. Originally, only a single I-225 was ordered, though a second prototype was later ordered with a 1,228 kW (1,647 hp) AM-42FB engine.

== Operational history ==
The first I-220 prototype was rolled out at Khodynka in June 1943. The aircraft made its first flight in July 1943 piloted by A. P. Yakimov. Test pilots found the aircraft to have favorable performance, save for the low-altitude rating for the AM-38F engine. The second prototype, powered by the AM-39 engine and fitted with all four cannons, each with 100 rounds, was rolled out in July 1943. Factory flight testing of the second prototype was conducted between July and August 1943 before being handed over to the Soviet Air Forces (VVS). The VVS conducted further flight testing between 14 and 24 July 1944, ending when the aircraft suffered an engine failure. Meanwhile, the first prototype was fitted with an AM-39 engine. Flight testing with the new engine was conducted between January and August 1944.

Flight testing of the improved I-221 began on 2 December 1943, with Yakimov at the controls on its first flight, and ended when the aircraft was damaged beyond repair in a belly landing. The similar I-222 rolled out on 23 April 1944 and was first flown with its original three-bladed propeller on 7 May of that year by test pilot A. I. Zhukov. Shortly after testing began, the three-bladed propeller was replaced by a four-bladed unit. During testing the I-222 was found to have the best high-altitude performance of all Samolyot A variants, as well as the best service ceiling of any Allied piston-engined fighter, though at low altitudes it was slower than the other Samolyot A versions. The VVS assigned the designation MiG-7 for the production version of the I-222, but by 1944 the need for a high-altitude fighter was no longer urgent and no production aircraft were ordered.

The I-224 was rolled out in September 1944 and flight testing began on 20 October with Yakimov at the controls. The aircraft was lost when the supercharger disintegrated, leading to an engine fire which caused Yakimov to bail out. The I-225 made its first flight on 21 July 1944, once again with Yakimov piloting, and over the next two days it had completed 15 flights before suffering an engine failure which resulted in the loss of the aircraft. The second I-225 had a brief flight test period beginning on 14 March 1945, during which it proved to be the second-fastest Soviet piston-engined fighter, second only to the VK-108-powered Yakovlev Yak-3.

== Variants ==
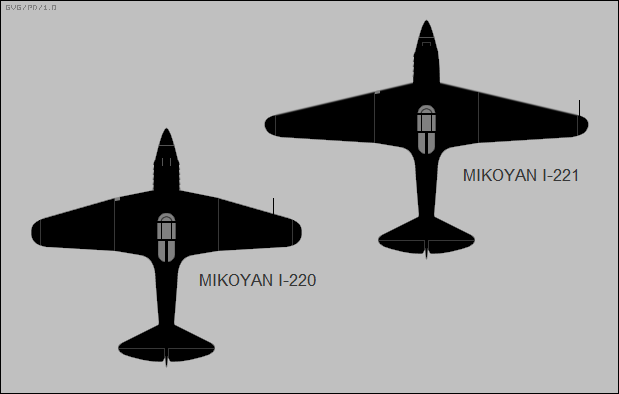
I-220 (left) and I-221 (right)

I-220 (Samolyot A)
First variant powered by a Mikulin AM-38F or AM-39 engine. Two built.
I-221 (Samolyot 2A)
Variant developed for higher performance at high altitudes with a longer wingspan and powered by an AM-39A turbo-supercharged engine. One built.
I-222 (Samolyot 3A)
Based on the I-221 but with an AM-39B-1 turbo-supercharged engine and other changes. One built.
I-224 (Samolyot 4A)
Based on the I-222 but with an aluminum cockpit. One built.
I-225 (Samolyot 5A)
Based on the I-220 but with a Mikulin AM-42B or AM-42FB engine and metal wings and cockpit. Two built.
MiG-11
Designation reserved for an unbuilt production version of the I-220.
MiG-7
Designation reserved for an unbuilt production version of the I-222. Not to be confused with the experimental MiG-3 variant of the same name.

== Operators ==
Soviet Union

- Soviet Air Forces

== Specifications (I-220, second prototype) ==
Data from

General characteristics

- Crew: 1
- Length: 9.603 m (31 ft 6 in)
- Wingspan: 11 m (36 ft 1 in)
- Wing area: 20.38 m^{2} (219.38 sq ft)
- Airfoil: CAHI laminar-flow
- Empty weight: 3,101 kg (6,836 lb)
- Gross weight: 3,647 kg (8,040 lb)
- Fuel capacity: 335 kg (738.5 lb)
- Oil capacity: 45 kg (99 lb)
- Powerplant: 1 × Mikulin AM-39 V12 piston engine, 1,100 kW (1,500 hp)
- Propellers: 3-bladed AV-5A propeller, 3.6 m (11 ft 9.75 in) diameter

Performance

- Maximum speed: 697 km/h (433 mph, 376 kn) at 7,000 m (23,000 ft)630–660 km (391.5–410 mi)
- Service ceiling: 11,000 m (36,090 ft)
- Range: 630–660 km (391.5–410 mi)
- Climb to 5,000 m (16,404 ft): 4.5 min

Armament

- 4x ShVAK cannons (100 rounds each)
