= Mikoyan-Gurevich MiG-3 =

Soviet single-seat WWII fighter aircraft

MiG-3
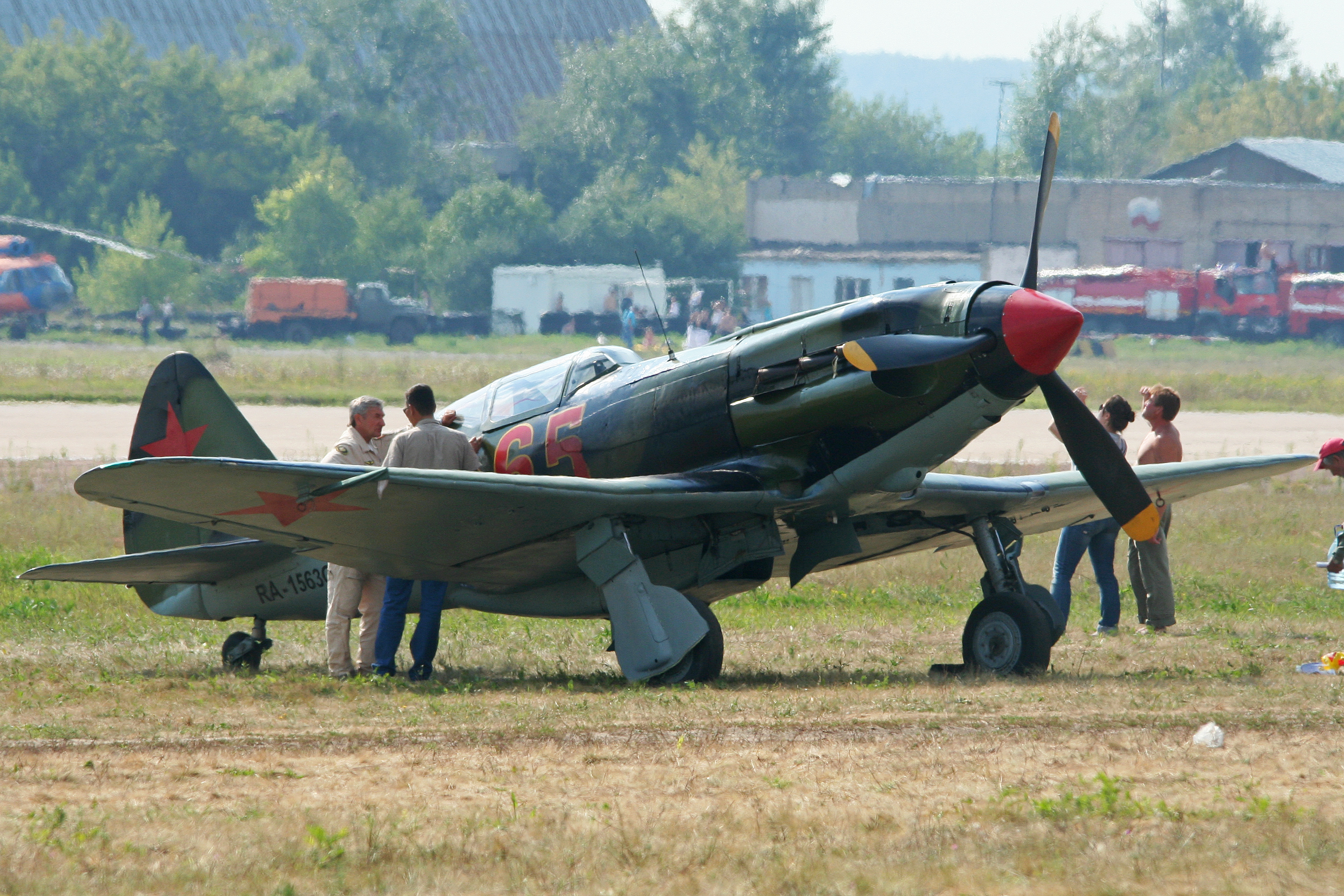
- A restored MiG-3 at an air show in Russia, 2012

General information
- Type: Fighter/Interceptor
- National origin: Soviet Union
- Manufacturer: Mikoyan-Gurevich
- Primary users: Soviet Air Forces (VVS) Soviet Air Defence Forces (PVO); Soviet Naval Aviation
- Number built: 3,422

History
- Manufactured: 1940–1941
- Introduction date: 1941
- First flight: 29 October 1940
- Retired: 1945
- Developed from: Mikoyan-Gurevich MiG-1
- Variant: Mikoyan-Gurevich I-211

The Mikoyan-Gurevich MiG-3 (Russian: Микоян и Гуревич МиГ-3) is a Soviet interceptor used during World War II. It was a development of the MiG-1 by the OKO (opytno-konstruktorskij otdel—Experimental Design Department) of Zavod (Factory) No. 1 in Moscow to remedy problems found during the MiG-1's development and operations. It replaced the MiG-1 on the production line at Factory No. 1 on 20 December 1940 and was built in large numbers during 1941 before Factory No. 1 was converted to build the Ilyushin Il-2.

On 22 June 1941, at the beginning of Operation Barbarossa, some 981 were in service with the Soviet Air Forces (VVS), the Soviet Air Defence Forces (PVO) and Soviet Naval Aviation. The MiG-3 was difficult to fly in peacetime and much more so in combat. Originally designed as a high-altitude fighter-interceptor, combat over the Eastern Front was generally at lower altitudes, where it was inferior to the German Messerschmitt Bf 109 as well as most of its Soviet contemporaries. It was also pressed into service as a fighter-bomber during the autumn of 1941, but it was equally unsuited for this. The losses suffered in combat were very high, in percentage the highest among all the VVS fighters, with 1,432 shot down. The survivors were concentrated in the PVO, where its disadvantages mattered less, the last being withdrawn from service before the end of the war.

== Development ==
The large number of defects noted during flight testing of the MiG-1 forced Mikoyan and Gurevich to make multiple modifications to the design. Testing was done on a full-size aircraft in the T-1 wind tunnel belonging to the Central Aero and Hydrodynamics Institute (TsAGI) to evaluate the problems and their proposed solutions. The first aircraft to see all of these changes applied was the fourth prototype of the I-200. It first flew on 29 October 1940 and was approved for production after passing its State acceptance trials. The first MiG-3, as the improved aircraft was named on 9 December, was completed on 20 December 1940 and another 20 were delivered by the end of the year.

These changes included:

- The engine was moved forward 100 mm (4 in) to improve longitudinal stability.
- A new water radiator (OP-310) was fitted
- The first two modifications allowed an additional 250 litres (66 US gal) fuel tank to be fitted underneath the pilot's seat.
- The outer wing panel dihedral was increased by one degree to increase lateral stability.
- An additional oil tank was mounted under the engine.
- Piping was fitted to use cooled inert exhaust gasses in the fuel tanks to reduce the chance of fire.
- The back of the pilot's seat was armored with an 8 mm (0.31 in) plate (increased to 9 mm (0.35 in) in later models).
- The supercharger intakes were streamlined.
- The main landing gear was strengthened and the size of the main wheels was increased to 650 x 200 mm (25.5 x 7.87 in).
- The canopy glazing was extended aft to improve the view to the rear which allowed for the installation of a shelf behind the pilot for an RSI-1 radio (later upgraded to an RSI-4).
- The instrument panel layout was improved and a PBP-1A gunsight replaced the original PBP-1.
- Ammunition for the ShKAS guns was increased to 750 rounds per gun.
- Two additional underwing hardpoints were added to carry up to 220 kg (485 lb) of bombs, spray containers or RS-82 rockets.

State acceptance testing of two production aircraft was conducted between 27 January and 26 February 1941. They were found to be over 250 kg (550 lb) heavier than the MiG-1, which reduced maneuverability and field performance. Time to 5,000 m (16,000 ft) decreased by over a minute and the service ceiling proved to be 500 m (1,600 ft) less. The MiG-3 was faster at sea level and at altitude. While the ranges reached by both aircraft were farther than that of the older aircraft, they were still less than the 1,000 km (620 mi) required. Mikoyan and Gurevich protested against the range results as their calculations showed that the MiG-3 could reach 1,010 km (630 mi) based on a specific fuel consumption (SFC) of 0.46 kg/km (1.64 lb/mile). During the State acceptance trials the SFC was 0.48 kg/km (1.71 lb/mile) but the operational trials conducted earlier showed a SFC of 0.38 kg/km (1.35 lb/mile). They blamed the deficiency on a failure to use an altitude correction and that the engines had not been properly adjusted. They went as far as arranging for two more flights between Leningrad and Moscow to prove that the MiG-3 could fly 1,000 km (621 mi). Two production aircraft were flown on ranges of 1,100 km (680 mi) and 971 km (603 mi), flying at 90% of maximum speed and at an altitude of 7,300 m (24,000 ft), contradicting the report of the NII VVS (Naoochno-Issledovatel'skiy Institoot Voenno-Vozdushnye Sily—Air Force Scientific Test Institute).

Despite the teething problems with the MiG-3, in 1941, one of the aircraft's designers—Mikhail Gurevich—was awarded the State Stalin Prize for his contribution to Soviet aviation.

A number of reports had been received about poor quality aircraft received by the regiments which pointed directly at the NII VVS as it was responsible for monitoring the quality of the aircraft delivered to the VVS. On 31 May 1941 the People's Commissariat of Defense decreed that the NII VVS had been negligent. A number of senior managers were demoted and the head of the Institute, Major General A. I. Filin was summarily executed.

A number of MiG-3s were found to have unacceptable performance at high altitudes despite having been designed as a high-altitude interceptor. The oxygen supply was often insufficient and the stall and spin characteristics were very dangerous, especially to inexperienced pilots. This was demonstrated on 10 April 1941 when three pilots of the 31st Fighter Regiment of the Air Defenses (IAP PVO) attempted to intercept a German high-altitude reconnaissance aircraft over Kaunas, Lithuania, flying at 9,000 m (30,000 ft). All three aircraft entered irrecoverable spins and the pilots were forced to bail out, one being killed. The NII VVS sent an engineer to investigate and he found that the pilots had flown very few hours on the MiG-3 and that that was their first high-altitude sortie. Other problems included insufficient fuel and oil pressure at altitude due to problems with the pumps.

=== Comparison with other fighters ===
The MiG-3's top speed of 640 km/h (398 mph) at 7,200 metres (23,622 ft) was faster than the 615 km/h (382 mph) of the German Messerschmitt Bf 109 F-2 in service at the beginning of 1941 and the British Supermarine Spitfire V's 603 km/h (375 mph). At lower altitudes the MiG's speed advantage disappeared as its maximum speed at sea level was only 505 km/h (314 mph) while the Bf 109F-2 could do 515 km/h (320 mph). Unfortunately for the MiG-3 and its pilots, aerial combat over the Eastern Front generally took place at low and medium altitudes where it had no speed advantage.

The MiG's loaded weight of 3,350 kg (7,385 lb) was greater than the Bf 109F-2's 2,728 kg (6,014 lb) and it was less maneuverable in the horizontal plane than the Bf 109 due to its higher wing loading. This lack of maneuverability was exacerbated by the MiG-3's poor climb performance, its instability at high speeds (which can make aerial gunnery difficult due to the point of aim "wandering" and requiring constant pilot input to remain on target), and its underpowered armament.

The MiG-3's standard armament was one 12.7 mm (0.50 in) UBS machine gun and two 7.62 mm (0.30 in) ShKAS machine guns, all mounted in the engine cowling and synchronized to fire through the propeller arc. In contrast, most versions of the German Messerschmitt Bf 109 that it encountered had one 20 mm (0.79 in) cannon and two 7.92 mm (0.31 in) machine guns (although the Bf 109F used during Operation Barbarossa had a 15 mm MG 151/15, meaning that it was armed little better than the MiG). To remedy this problem, 821 aircraft were built with one 12.7 mm UBK machine gun in a pod under each wing in mid-1941. This lowered its speed by about 20 km/h (12 mph) at all altitudes, which was unpopular with the pilots, some of whom removed the pods. One hundred aircraft were equipped with a pair of UBS machine guns in lieu of the ShKAS weapons. Another 215 aircraft also had just the UBS machine guns but were fitted to carry six RS-82 rockets. A total of 72 aircraft mounted a pair of 20 mm ShVAK cannon. A wide variety of armaments were experimented with by various units at the requests of their pilots or to make up shortages.

=== Production ===
The NKAP (Narodnyy komissariat aviatsionnoy promyshlennosti—People's Commission of the Aircraft Industry) announced its 1941 production plan on 9 December 1940. Zavod Nr. 1 in Moscow-Chodinka would be required to build a total of 3,500 in 1941. Zavod Nr. 43 in Kiev would begin construction of the MiG-3 and complete one hundred aircraft by the end of the year and Zavod Nr. 21 in Gor'kiy would start to plan construction of an upgraded version of the MiG-3, although this last program was canceled shortly afterwards. 140 were delivered in January 1941 and Zavod Nr. 1 was on pace to exceed its quota with 496 delivered in July, 562 in August and 450 in September. In October the German advance on Moscow forced the Zavod Nr. 1, and its OKO, to evacuate to Kuybyshev where production resumed under unsuitable conditions. However, shortly afterwards, Stalin sent a telegram to the directors of the plants building the Ilyushin Il-2 and the MiG-3 demanding more Il-2 production, resulting in MiG-3 production being terminated in favor of the Il-2, with a final thirty aircraft built in 1942 from spares. An additional factor in cancellation of the MiG-3 was that its Mikulin AM-35A engine was closely related to the Il-2's AM-38 allowing production to be quickly switched from one to the other.

MiG-3 production at Zavod Nr. 1 had already been planned to be reduced from a NKAP order of 27 August that required the factory to produce 420 fighters in September, declining to 100 in December with Il-2 production ramping up to 250 in December while the former aircraft repair plant at Khodynka Aerodrome (Moscow) was to be transferred to the NKAP, redesignated as Zavod Nr. 165, and begin production of MiG-3s. The German advance disrupted these plans for Zavod 165 and it never produced a single MiG-3.

== Operational history ==
A ground-level view emphasizing the long nose

Deliveries to frontline fighter regiments began in the spring of 1941 and were a handful for pilots accustomed to the lower-performance and docile Polikarpov I-152 and I-153 biplanes and the Polikarpov I-16 monoplane. It remained tricky and demanding to fly even after the extensive improvements made over the MiG-1. Many fighter regiments had not kept pace in training pilots to handle the MiG and the rapid pace of deliveries resulted in many units having more MiGs than trained pilots during the Operation Barbarossa, the German invasion. By 1 June 1941, 1,029 MIG-3s were on strength, but there were only 494 trained pilots.

In contrast to the untrained pilots of the 31st Fighter Regiment, those of the 4th Fighter Regiment were able to claim three German high-altitude reconnaissance aircraft shot down before war broke out in June 1941. High-altitude combat of this sort was to be rare on the Eastern Front where most air-to-air engagements were at altitudes well below 5,000 m (16,000 ft). At these altitudes the MiG-3 was outclassed by the Bf 109 in all respects, and even by other new Soviet fighters such as the Yakovlev Yak-1. The shortage of ground-attack aircraft in 1941 forced it into that role as well, for which it was totally unsuited. Pilot Alexander E. Shvarev recalled: "The Mig was perfect at altitudes of 4,000 m and above. But at lower altitudes it was, as they say, 'a cow'. That was the first weakness. The second was its armament: weapons failure dogged this aircraft. The third weakness was its gunsights, which were inaccurate: that's why we closed in as much as we could and fired point blank".

On 22 June 1941, most MiG-3s and MiG-1s were in the border military districts of the Soviet Union. The Leningrad Military District had 164, 135 were in the Baltic Military District, 233 in the Western Special Military District, 190 in the Kiev Military District and 195 in the Odessa Military District for a total of 917 on hand, of which only 81 were non-operational. An additional 64 MiGs were assigned to Naval Aviation, 38 in the Air Force of the Baltic Fleet and 26 in the Air Force of the Black Sea Fleet.

The 4th and 55th Fighter Regiments had most of the MiG-3s assigned to the Odessa Military District and their experiences on the first day of the war may be taken as typical. The 4th, an experienced unit, shot down a Romanian Bristol Blenheim reconnaissance bomber, confirmed by postwar research, and lost one aircraft which crashed into an obstacle on takeoff. The 55th was much less experienced with the MiG-3 and claimed three aircraft shot down, although recent research confirms only one German Henschel Hs 126 was 40 per cent damaged, and suffered three pilots killed and nine aircraft lost. The most unusual case was the pair of MiG-3s dispatched from the 55th on a reconnaissance mission to Ploieşti that failed to properly calculate their fuel consumption and both were forced to land when they ran out of fuel.

Most of the MiG-3s assigned to the interior military districts were transferred to the PVO where their lack of performance at low altitudes was not so important. On 10 July 299 were assigned to the PVO, the bulk of them belonging to the 6th PVO Corps at Moscow, while only 293 remained with the VVS, and 60 with the Naval Air Forces, a total of only 652 despite deliveries of several hundred aircraft. By 1 October, on the eve of the German offensive towards Moscow codenamed Operation Typhoon, only 257 were assigned to VVS units, 209 to the PVO, and 46 to the Navy, a total of only 512, a decrease of 140 fighters since 10 July, despite deliveries of over a thousand aircraft in the intervening period. By 5 December, the start of the Soviet counter-offensive that drove the Germans back from the gates of Moscow, the Navy had 33 MiGs on hand, the VVS 210 and the PVO 309. This was a total of 552, an increase of only 40 aircraft from 1 October.

Over the winter of 1941–42 the Soviets transferred all of the remaining MiG-3s to the Navy and PVO so that on 1 May 1942 none were left on strength with the VVS. By 1 May 1942, Naval Aviation had 37 MiGs on strength, while the PVO had 323 on hand on 10 May. By 1 June 1944, the Navy had transferred all its aircraft to the PVO, which reported only 17 on its own strength, and all of those were gone by 1 January 1945. Undoubtedly more remained in training units and the like, but none were assigned to combat units by then.

Even with the MiG-3's limitations, Aleksandr Pokryshkin, the third-leading Soviet, and Allied, ace of the war, with 53 official air victories (plus six shared), recorded a number of those victories while flying a MiG-3 at the beginning of the war. He later recalled:

Its designers rarely succeeded in matching both the fighter's flight characteristics with its firepower... the operational advantage of the MiG-3 seemed to be obscured by its certain defects. However, these advantages could undoubtedly be exploited by a pilot able to discover them

== Variants ==
There were several attempts to re-engine the aircraft with the engine it was originally designed for, the Mikulin AM-37. This was designated the MiG-7, and one MiG-3 was converted to evaluate the engine in May 1941. It proved to have poor longitudinal stability and the powerplant itself still had a number of problems. The German invasion the following month caused the cancellation of the development of the AM-37 as Mikulin's resources were required for the AM-35 and AM-38 engines already in production.

To improve the low-level performance of the MiG-3, one aircraft was tested with the AM-38 engine used by the Il-2 in July 1941. It proved to be 14 km/h (8.7 mph) faster than the normal MiG-3 at sea level and was more maneuverable as well. It was recommended for production after passing its State acceptance trials in September, provided that a cure for the engine's tendency to overheat in ambient temperatures above 16 °C (61 °F) was found. However the sole prototype was shot down on 5 October during flight tests and it was decided not to proceed with the idea as all AM-38 production was allocated to the Il-2. Ironically, later in the war, about 80 MiG-3s were reengined with AM-38s to make them airworthy again. Many of these were rearmed with two 20 mm ShVAK cannon as well.

On 13 May 1941 the NKAP ordered the OKO to convert a MiG-3 to use the Shvetsov ASh-82A radial engine then entering production. The resulting aircraft had a variety of names, including I-210, MiG-3-82, Samolet IKh or Izdeliye 65. The design was a failure, but was promising enough to continue the program as the I-211.

A variety of other tests and other projects were conducted using MiG-3s. Leading edge slats were evaluated in 1941 although they were not fitted on production aircraft, but were used by the I-210. A six-bladed propeller was fitted on one aircraft to increase thrust at high altitude to enable the fighter to catch the high-flying Junkers Ju 86P aircraft then overflying Moscow. A new propeller hub was made that mounted six standard VISh-61 blades, but nothing more is known of the project. Four aircraft were converted to carry AFA-I cameras for evaluation and a fifth was then converted to evaluate all the improvements learned from the first four. It was approved for use after trials at the NII VVS. To improve their service ceiling two aircraft were reduced in weight to 3,098 kg (6,830 lb), but no further details are known other than one reached a height of 11,750 metres (38,550 ft).

There was also a proposal in 1941 to use the MiG-3 as part of a Zveno combination with a Petlyakov Pe-8 mother ship. The four-engined bomber would carry two MiG-3SPB (Skorostnoy Pikeeruyushchiy Bombardirovshchik—Fast Dive Bomber) fighters, modified to carry a 250 kg (550 lb) FAB-250 bomb under each wing, close to the target and would then release them to conduct the attack after which they would fly back to the nearest friendly airbase. Some preliminary work was done before the Germans invaded, but it was abandoned afterwards due to the pressure of other work. The combination was estimated to have a maximum speed of 260 km/h (160 mph) and a range of 1,450 km (900 mi).

=== Summary of variants ===
MiG-3
Production variant powered by a Mikulin AM-35A engine.
MiG-3SPB
Skorostnoy Pikeeruyushchiy Bombardirovshchik (Fast Dive Bomber), proposed parasite fighter variant for the Zveno project to be carried by a Petlyakov Pe-8 mother ship.
MiG-7
Single MiG-3 re-engined with a Mikulin AM-37. Not to be confused with the unbuilt production variant of the I-222.
I-210 (Samolet IKh/Izdeliye 65)
Five prototypes powered by a Shvetsov ASh-82A radial engine. Also known as the MiG-3-82 or MiG-9 (not to be confused with the later Mikoyan-Gurevich MiG-9 jet fighter).
I-211 (Samolet Ye)
Derivative of the I-210 with a redesigned fuselage and powered by a Shvetsov ASh-82F engine. Single prototype built.
I-230 (Samolet D)
Planned improvement/successor to MiG-3 with a redesigned fuselage and Mikulin AM-35A engine installation. One prototype and five pre-production aircraft built. Production aircraft would have been designated MiG-3U or MiG-3D.
I-231 (Samolet 2D)
Improved I-230 with a more powerful Mikulin AM-39 engine. Production aircraft would have been designated MiG-3DD.
Undesignated experimental MiG-3 variants
- Single MiG-3 tested with a Mikulin AM-38 engine.
- Single MiG-3 tested with leading-edge slats in 1940.
- Single MiG-3 tested with a six-bladed propeller.
- Five MiG-3s tested with AFA-I cameras.

== Operators ==
Soviet Union

- Soviet Air Forces (VVS)
- Soviet Air Defence Forces (PVO)
- Soviet Naval Aviation

Romania

- Royal Romanian Air Force: One aircraft captured in March 1942 following a pilot defection, used as an opposition trainer.

== Surviving aircraft ==
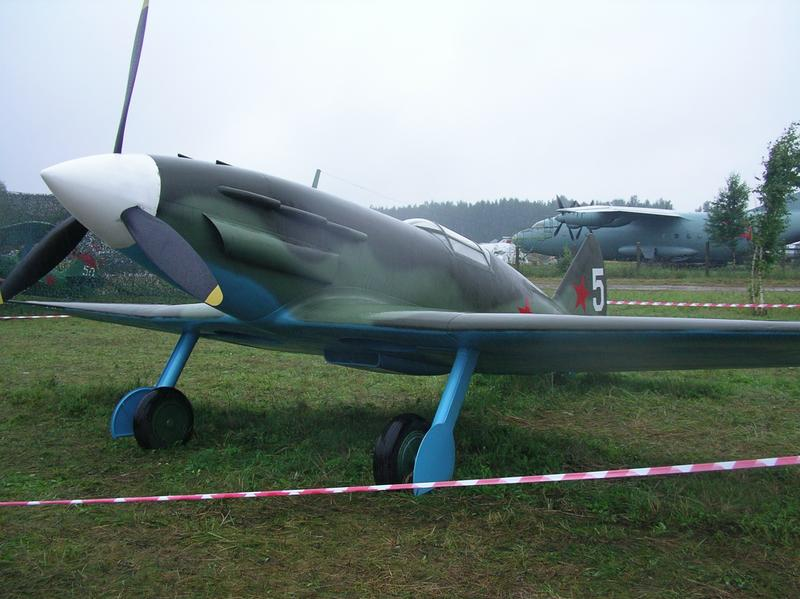
MiG-3 replica at Central Air Force Museum in Monino. Note the unusual low canopy.

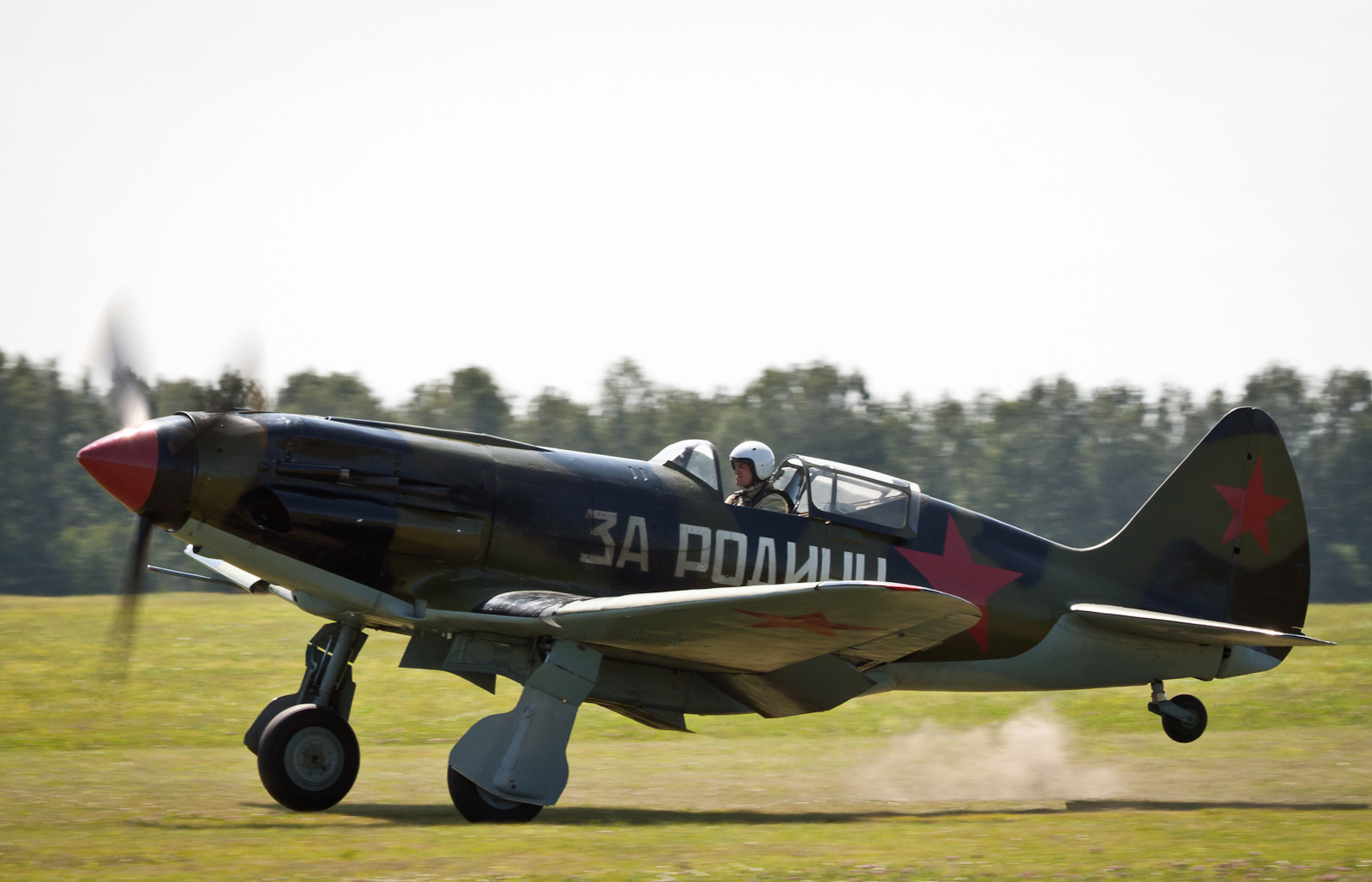
A restored MiG-3 at an air show in Russia, 2011

The Russian company Aviarestoration has rebuilt three MiG-3s. They all use Allison V-12 engines. One is in the US in the Military Aviation Museum of Pungo, Virginia and another, rebuilt from a MiG-3 shot down in 1942, first flew again around the start of 2010. It will remain in Russia.

== Specifications (MiG-3) ==
3-view drawing of MiG-3

Data from MiG: Fifty Years of Secret Aircraft Design

General characteristics

- Crew: 1
- Length: 8.25 m (27 ft 1 in)
- Wingspan: 10.2 m (33 ft 6 in)
- Height: 3.3 m (10 ft 10 in)
- Wing area: 17.44 m^{2} (187.7 sq ft)
- Airfoil: root:Clark YH (14%); tip Clark YH (8%)
- Empty weight: 2,699 kg (5,950 lb)
- Gross weight: 3,355 kg (7,397 lb)
- Powerplant: 1 × Mikulin AM-35A V-12 liquid-cooled piston engine, 993 kW (1,332 hp)
- Propellers: 3-bladed variable-pitch propeller

Performance

- Maximum speed: 505 km/h (314 mph, 273 kn) at sea level

640 km/h (400 mph; 350 kn) at 7,800 m (25,600 ft)

- Combat range: 820 km (510 mi, 440 nmi)
- Service ceiling: 12,000 m (39,000 ft)
- Time to altitude: 8,000 m (26,000 ft) in 10 minutes 17 seconds
- Wing loading: 155 kg/m^{2} (32 lb/sq ft)
- Power/mass: 0.30 kW/kg (0.18 hp/lb)

Armament

- Guns:

- 1 × 12.7 mm Berezin UBS machine gun
- 2 × 7.62 mm ShKAS machine guns in the cowl
- (later models would feature additional 2 × UBK machine guns underwing, one per wing)

- Rockets: 6 × RS-82 rockets
- Bombs: 2 × 100 kg (220 lb) bombs

== See also ==
Related development

- Mikoyan-Gurevich MiG-1
- Mikoyan-Gurevich I-211

Aircraft of comparable role, configuration, and era

- Curtiss P-40 Warhawk
- Dewoitine D.520
- Heinkel He 100
- Kawasaki Ki-61 Hien
- Lavochkin-Gorbunov-Gudkov LaGG-3
- Macchi C.202 Folgore
- Messerschmitt Bf 109F
- Yakovlev Yak-1

Related lists

- List of aircraft of World War II
- List of fighter aircraft
- List of military aircraft of the Soviet Union and the CIS
