= Rostislav Belyakov =

Rostislav Beliakov (Ростислав Аполлосович Беляков) (Murom, March 4, 1919 – Moscow, February 28, 2014) was a Russian fighter aircraft designer. He spent his career at the MiG design bureau, which he headed from 1969 after the death of Artem Mikoyan until the 1990s. He was responsible for the design of several of the Soviet Union's most successful and influential fighter aircraft, including the MiG-29 and MiG-31.

== Life ==
Rostislav Beliakov joined MiG in 1941 after graduating from the Moscow Aviation Institute. The design bureau was barely two years old and faced the challenge of contributing to the expansion and modernization of the Soviet Air Force during World War II. Beliakov rose quickly through the ranks at MiG, being appointed deputy chief designer in 1957. He oversaw the design of the MiG-21 and MiG-23 fighters, which were eventually produced in large numbers and exported to Soviet allies, where they saw combat in numerous Cold War conflicts.

In 1969, following the death of Artem Mikoyan (MiG's co-founder with Mikhail Gurevich), Rostislav Beliakov took over as head of the design bureau, holding the title of chief designer. Under his leadership, MiG developed a family of fourth-generation fighters, including the MiG-29 Fulcrum multirole fighter-bomber and the MiG-31 Foxhound high-performance interceptor. The Fulcrum, developed in secret and conceived as a counterpart to the American-made F-15 and F-16 fighters, was considered by NATO powers to be a major breakthrough for the Soviet ranks due to its design, which included significant innovations in aerodynamics, propulsion, electronics, and weaponry.

Despite the success and international recognition of the capabilities of the new fighter family developed by MiG, Rostislav Beliakov's name remained largely unknown to the rest of the world. It wasn't until 1991 that Beliakov became known to the West at the Paris Air Show at Le Bourget. The collapse of the Soviet Union opened up an opportunity for expansion for Russian aerospace manufacturers, and Beliakov, to demonstrate the end of arms export restrictions, declared, "If you have 40 million dollars, we'll sell you a MiG-31." Beliakov's efforts to secure new customers were hampered by fierce international competition, Western pilots' prejudices against Soviet-made aircraft, and the bureaucracy of the new Russian administration, which he accused in 1992 of seizing all the money MiG earned from sales. Despite this, MiG managed to sell its state-of-the-art fighters to several countries, where they saw combat in various conflicts.

During the 1993 Russian constitutional crisis, Rostislav Beliakov supported the forces opposed to President Boris Yeltsin. This earned him the enmity of the president, who ultimately emerged victorious. Two years later, in 1995, he announced his resignation as head of MiG due to health problems, according to Beliakov himself.

== Personal life ==
He was married to Lyudmila Nikolaevna Shvernik (1916-2003), television design engineer, daughter of Nikolai Shvernik.
