= Laos–Soviet Union relations =

Laos-Soviet relations
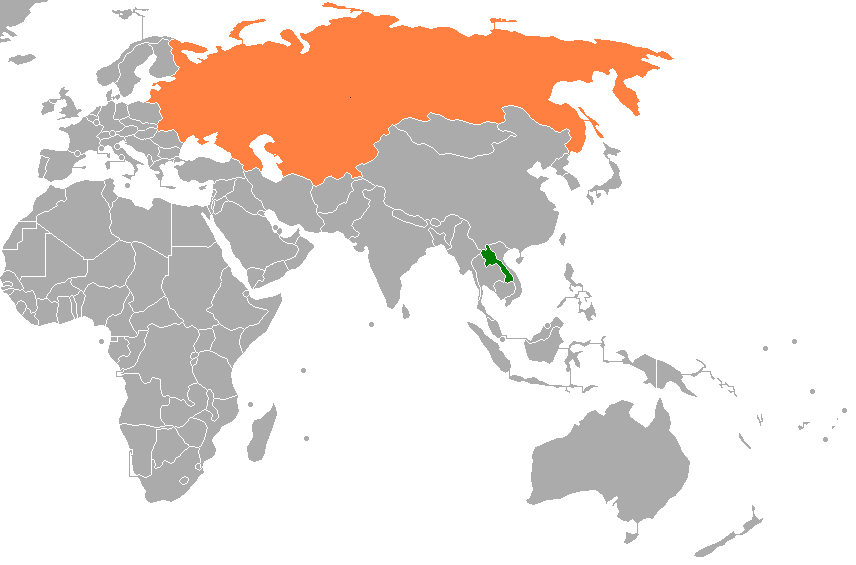

- Laos: Soviet Union

Laotian–Soviet relations refers to the historical relationship between Laos and the Soviet Union.

== Early years ==
Laos and the Soviet Union established diplomatic relations on 7 October 1960. The Laotian representative in France was accredited to the Soviet Union, and the Ambassador of the Soviet Union to Cambodia was accredited to Laos.

== Socialist construction in Laos ==
With the victory of the Pathet Lao, Laos and the Soviet Union developed close bilateral links. Soviet aid workers substituted American aid workers as the political realities in Laos shifted. Laos clearly recognized the Soviet position as the leading force in the Socialist Bloc. The two states began exchanging a wide stream of state, party, army, youth and friendship delegations. Moreover, the Soviet Union contributed to the build-up of the Laotian armed forces.

== Final period ==
At its peak, Soviet aid to Laos made up the bulk of the foreign assistance that Laos received. Soviet aid in the 1980s included the presence of some 1,500 technicians and advisers. Many Laotian students studied at Soviet institutions, some 300 Laotian students received scholarships to study in the Soviet Union every year. The Soviet Union also contributed to infrastructure projects, such as the building of roads, airports, bridges, broadcasting facilities and hospitals. The state-to-state assistance also included large deliveries of military materials, such as MiG fighter jets. But in 1989, a gradual reduction of Soviet aid took place.

By 1990, the Soviet bilateral external aid to Laos had been reduced to 36% of the total amount of foreign assistance that Laos received in that year. That was a reduction from a previous level of 60%. The number of scholarships for studies in the Soviet Union was drastically reduced as well. Moreover, as the Soviets shifted their focus of their increasingly limited diplomatic leverage in the region towards trying to consolidate cooperation of the other permanent members of the United Nations for the sake of finding a settlement to the Cambodian Civil War, relations with Laos were deprioritzed even further. As the Soviet Union fell apart, Laos began reorienting itself towards developing better relations with its South-East Asian neighbours. In 1997, Laos joined ASEAN.
