= Mikulin AM-39 =

Soviet V12 piston aircraft engine

- Type: Liquid-cooled V12 piston engine
- Manufacturer: Mikulin
- First run: 1942
- Major applications: Mikoyan-Gurevich I-220
- Developed from: Mikulin AM-35

The Mikulin AM-39 was a 1940s Soviet aircraft piston engine. Representing a high-output version of the AM-35A, AM-39 was used on the Mikoyan-Gurevich I-220 and Polikarpov ITP fighters, and the Tupolev SDB bomber.

== Specifications (AM-39FN) ==
Data from Kotelnikov

=== General characteristics ===
- Type: 60° V12 aircraft piston engine
- Bore: 160 mm (6.30 in)
- Stroke: 190mm/196.7mm (7.48 in/7.744 in) different between right and left cylinder bank due to articulated connecting rods
- Displacement: 46.66 L (2,847 in³)
- Dry weight: 970 kg (2,138 lb)

=== Components ===
- Supercharger: Two-speed centrifugal type supercharger with aftercooler
- Fuel system: Direct injection
- Cooling system: Liquid-cooled

=== Performance ===
- Power output: 1,588 kW (2,130 hp)
- Specific power: 34 kW/L (0.75 hp/in³)

== See also ==
Related development

- Mikulin AM-35

Related lists

- List of aircraft engines
