= Aleksandr Mikulin =

Aircraft jet engine designer

- Александр Микулин
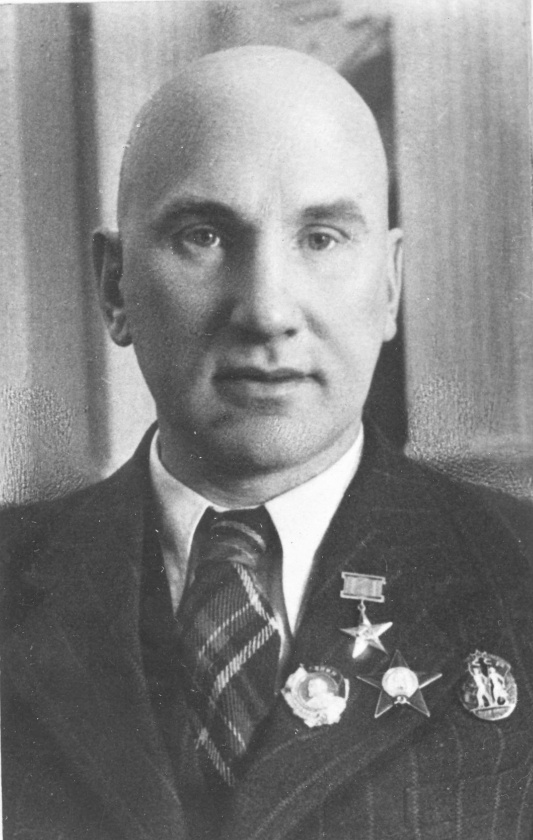
- Born: Aleksandr Aleksandrovich Mikulin; February 14, 1895; Vladimir, Russian Empire
- Died: May 13, 1985 (aged 90); Moscow, Soviet Union
- Engineering career
- Institutions: Mikulin OKB
- Projects: Tsar Tank
- Significant design: Mikulin AM-34

Aleksandr Aleksandrovich Mikulin (Russian: Александр Александрович Микулин; 14 February 1895 – 13 May 1985) was a Soviet aircraft engine designer and chief designer in the Mikulin OKB. His achievements include the first Soviet liquid-cooled aircraft piston engine, the Mikulin AM-34, and the Mikulin AM-3 turbojet engine for the Soviet Union's first jet airliner, the Tupolev Tu-104. Mikulin also took part in the Tsar Tank project.

== Engines ==
- M-17 – BMW VI built under licence
- AM-34
- AM-35 – Super charged inline 895-1007kw
- AM-37 – improved AM-35; only produced in small numbers as it was too unreliable
- AM-38 – low-altitude engine developed from the AM-35A
- AM-39 – higher power version of the AM-35A
- AM-41 – used on the Gudkov Gu-1
- AM-42 – higher power version of the AM-38F
- AM-43 – high-altitude engine, used on Tupolev Tu-1 and Ilyushin Il-16
- AM-44 – turbo-supercharged engine, used on Tupolev Tu-2DB
- AM-45
- AM-46
- AM-47 – used on the Ilyushin Il-20
- AM-2
- AM-3/RD-3
- AM-5 – renamed Tumansky RD-9 after Sergey Tumansky replaced Aleksandr Mikulin

== Awards ==
- Hero of Socialist Labour (1940)
- Two Stalin Prizes first degree (1941, 1942)
- Two Stalin Prizes second degree (1943, 1946)
- Orders and medals

== See also ==
- Soyuz Scientific Production Association
