= Polikarpov ITP =

Soviet fighter prototype

ITP
- The M-2 prototype of the ITP

General information
- Type: Fighter
- National origin: Soviet Union
- Manufacturer: Polikarpov
- Status: Cancelled
- Number built: 2

History
- First flight: 23 February 1942

The Polikarpov ITP (Istrebitel Tyazholiy Pushechniy; Russian: Истребитель Тяжелый Пушечный; Heavy Cannon Fighter) was a Soviet fighter prototype designed during World War II. Development was prolonged by the evacuation of the design bureau forced by the German advance on Moscow in the fall of 1941. By the time the second prototype was finished the Soviets had fighters with equivalent or better performance already in production and the program was cancelled.

== Development ==
In November 1940, Nikolai Polikarpov proposed a heavy cannon-armed fighter for bomber escort duties and ground attack missions. The new ITP was designed around either the 1,230 kW (1,650 hp) Klimov M-107P or the Mikulin AM-37 inline engines. Two armament configurations were planned. The first consisted of a 37-millimetre (1.5 in) cannon firing through the propeller hub and two synchronized 20-millimetre (0.79 in) ShVAK cannon mounted on each side of the fuselage nose. The 37 mm cannon was provided with 50 rounds and the ShVAK had 200 rounds each. The second configuration substituted an additional ShVAK with 200 rounds for the 37 mm cannon. It had racks for eight unguided RS-82 rockets underneath the wings.

The ITP was a low-wing, mixed construction monoplane with a wooden monocoque fuselage made from 'shpon', molded birch plywood. The two-spar metal wing was built in three sections with automatic leading edge slats. The engine radiators were built into the wing center section with intakes in the wing roots while the oil cooler was located under the engine. The curved, one-piece windshield lacked a flat front panel which gave the pilot a rather distorted view. The conventional undercarriage, including the tailwheel, was fully retractable. It carried 624 litres (137 imp gal; 165 US gal) of fuel in tanks between the spars of the wing center section. The rear fuselage, cockpit and tail resembled that of the Polikarpov I-185.

The first ITP prototype (M-1) was completed in October 1941 with a 1,300-horsepower (970 kW) M-107P engine. Due to German attacks, the aircraft was evacuated to Novosibirsk and did not make its first flight until 23 February 1942. The M-107P engine proved unreliable and was changed to a M-107A in late 1942. The 37 mm gun was removed in exchange for another 20 mm gun mounted on the side of the fuselage. Flight testing was not completed because the airframe was used for ground static testing, but the estimated maximum speed at 6,300 metres (20,669 ft) was 655 km/h (407 mph) with a time to 5,000 metres (16,404 ft) of 5.9 minutes.

The second ITP prototype (M-2) was built in 1942 and fitted with a Mikulin AM-37 engine which also proved unreliable and was replaced with a 1,345 kW (1,800 hp) Mikulin AM-39 that December. It first flew on 23 November 1943 but the manufacturer's flight tests were not completed until June 1944. Since several other aircraft with about the same level of performance were already available, it was not placed into production.

== Specifications (M-2) ==
Data from Gordon, Soviet Airpower in World War 2

General characteristics

- Crew: 1
- Length: 9.2 m (30 ft 2 in)
- Wingspan: 10 m (32 ft 10 in)
- Wing area: 16.5 m^{2} (178 sq ft)
- Empty weight: 2,910 kg (6,415 lb)
- Gross weight: 3,570 kg (7,871 lb)
- Powerplant: 1 × Mikulin AM-39 liquid-cooled V-12, 1,268 kW (1,700 hp)
- Propellers: 3-bladed

Performance

- Range: 980 km (610 mi, 530 nmi)
- Service ceiling: 11,500 m (37,700 ft)
- Time to altitude: six minutes to 5,000 metres (16,000 ft)
- Wing loading: 216 kg/m^{2} (44 lb/sq ft)

Armament

- Guns: 3 × 20 mm ShVAK cannons, 200 rpg
- Rockets: 8 × unguided RS-82

== See also ==
Related development

- Polikarpov I-185

Aircraft of comparable role, configuration, and era

- Yakovlev Yak-9T
