= Mikulin AM-37 =

- Type: liquid-cooled, V12 engine
- National origin: Soviet Union
- Manufacturer: Mikulin
- First run: 5 January 1941
- Manufactured: 1941
- Number built: 39+
- Developed from: Mikulin AM-35

The Mikulin AM-37 was a Soviet aircraft piston engine designed prior to Russia's entry into World War II. An improved version of the Mikulin AM-35 V12 engine, it was only produced in small numbers because of its unreliability.

== Development ==
Design work on a development of the AM-35 with boosted supercharging and an intercooler positioned behind the supercharger began on the factory's initiative in December 1939. A batch of ten prototypes was completed in 1940 and bench-testing began on 5 January 1941. It passed its State acceptance trials the following April and was approved for production. It was tested in a variety of aircraft, but proved to be unreliable and prone to overheating. Factory No. 24 in Moscow built only twenty-nine AM-37s, as the new engine was designated, in 1941 before the German advance forced the factory to evacuate in October. Mikulin had been unable to resolve the issues with the AM-37 in the meantime and production was not resumed.

== Variants ==
AM-37A
Planned version to be tested in February 1940, but no information if it was tested or it was even completed. 1,600 hp (1,200 kW) and a weight of 850 kg (1,870 lb).
AM-37TK
TK for toorbokompressor. Planned version with a turbocharger, no further information known.
AM-37P
P for Pushechnyy or cannon. A 1940 project for a model with an autocannon mounted in the space between the cylinders, firing through a hollow reduction-gear shaft. No further information available.
Am-37u/v or AM-37UV
UV for udlinyonniy val or lengthened shaft. An engine with a lengthened shaft and remote gearing for use in the Gudkov G-1 fighter that carried the engine behind the pilot. Ordered developed in 1940 and design work started in 1941, but it was not completed.

== Applications ==
- Mikoyan-Gurevich MiG-1
- Mikoyan-Gurevich MiG-3
- Mikoyan-Gurevich DIS
- Polikarpov TIS
- Tupolev Tu-2
- Yermolaev Yer-2

== Specifications ==
Data from Kotelnikov, Russian Piston Aero Engines

=== General characteristics ===
- Type: supercharged, liquid-cooled, V12 engine
- Bore: 160 mm (6.3 in)
- Stroke: 190 mm (7.5 in)
- Displacement: 45.84 L (2,797 in³)
- Dry weight: 885 kg (1,951 lb)
- Designer: Alexander Mikulin

=== Components ===
- Supercharger: single-speed geared centrifugal supercharger
- Cooling system: liquid-cooled

=== Performance ===
- Power output: 1,500 hp (1,119 kW)
- Compression ratio: 7.0:1
- Power-to-weight ratio: 0.77 hp/lb (1.26 kW/kg)

== See also ==
Related development

- Mikulin AM-35

Related lists

- List of aircraft engines
