= Mikhail Gurevich (aircraft designer) =

Soviet aircraft designer (1893–1976)

- Михаил Гуревич
- Born: 12 January 1893 [O.S. 31 December 1892] Rubanshchina, Kursk Governorate, Russian Empire
- Died: 12 November 1976 (aged 83); Leningrad, Russian SFSR, Soviet Union
- Engineering career
- Discipline: Aeronautical Engineering
- Employer: Mikoyan-Gurevich design bureau
- Significant design: MiG-1; MiG-3; MiG-15; MiG-17; MiG-19; MiG-21; MiG-23; MiG-25
- Awards: Hero of Socialist Labor

Mikhail Iosifovich Gurevich (Russian: Михаи́л Ио́сифович Гуре́вич) (12 January 1893 [O.S. 31 December 1892] – 12 November 1976), a Soviet aircraft-designer, co-founded the Mikoyan-Gurevich (MiG) military aviation bureau along with Artem Mikoyan. The bureau became famous for its fighter aircraft, rapid interceptors and multi-role combat aircraft which were staples of the Soviet Air Forces throughout the Cold War. The bureau designed 170 projects, of which 94 became serial-production models. In total, 45,000 MiG aircraft have been manufactured domestically, 11,000 of them for export. The last plane which Gurevich personally worked on before he retired in 1964 was the MiG-25.

== Life and career ==
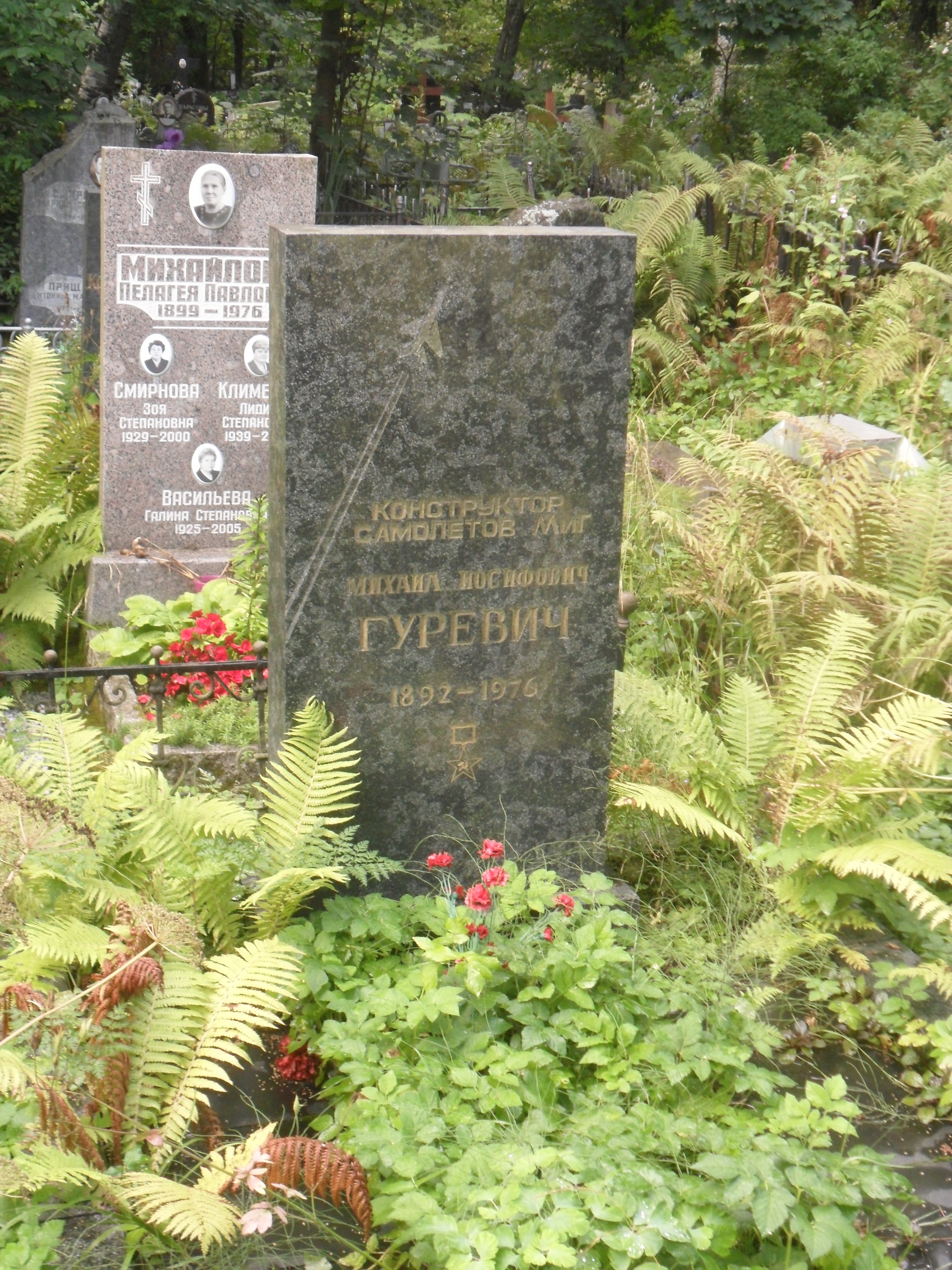
Grave of Mikhail Gurevich in Saint Petersburg.

Born to a Jewish family his father was a winery mechanic in the small township of Rubanshchina (Kursk region in Russia). In 1910 he graduated from gymnasium in Okhtyrka (Kharkiv region) with the silver medal and entered the Mathematics department at Kharkiv University. After a year, for participation in revolutionary activities, he was expelled from the university and from the region and continued his education in Montpellier University. He was at SUPAERO in Toulouse in the 1913 class with Marcel Bloch, who later took the name Marcel Dassault.

In the summer 1914 Gurevich was visiting his home when World War I broke out. This and later the Russian Civil War interrupted his education. In 1925 he graduated from the Aviation faculty of Kharkiv Technological Institute and worked as an engineer of the state company "Heat and Power".

In 1929 Gurevich moved to Moscow to pursue the career of aviation designer. Soviet design was a state-run affair, organised in so-called OKBs or design bureaus. In 1937 Gurevich headed a designer team in the Polikarpov Design Bureau, where he met his future team partner, Artem Mikoyan. In late 1939 they created the Mikoyan-Gurevich Design Bureau, with Gurevich in the position of Vice Chief Designer, and after 1957 as its Chief Designer, a post he kept until his retirement in 1964. This is remarkable, considering that he never joined the Communist Party.

In 1940 Mikoyan and Gurevich designed and built the high-altitude MiG-1 fighter plane, starting from a project partially developed by Polikarpov's team. The improved MiG-3 fighter aircraft was widely used during World War II. In the years after the war, the two designed the first Soviet jet fighters, including the first supersonic models. The last model Gurevich worked on was the MiG-25 interceptor, which is among the fastest military aircraft ever to enter service.

== Honours and awards ==
- Hero of Socialist Labor (1957)
- Stalin Prize first degree (1941, 1947, 1948, 1952, 1953)
- Stalin Prize second degree (1949)
- Order of Lenin (1962)
