= Mikulin AM-42 =

1940s Soviet aircraft piston engine

AM-42
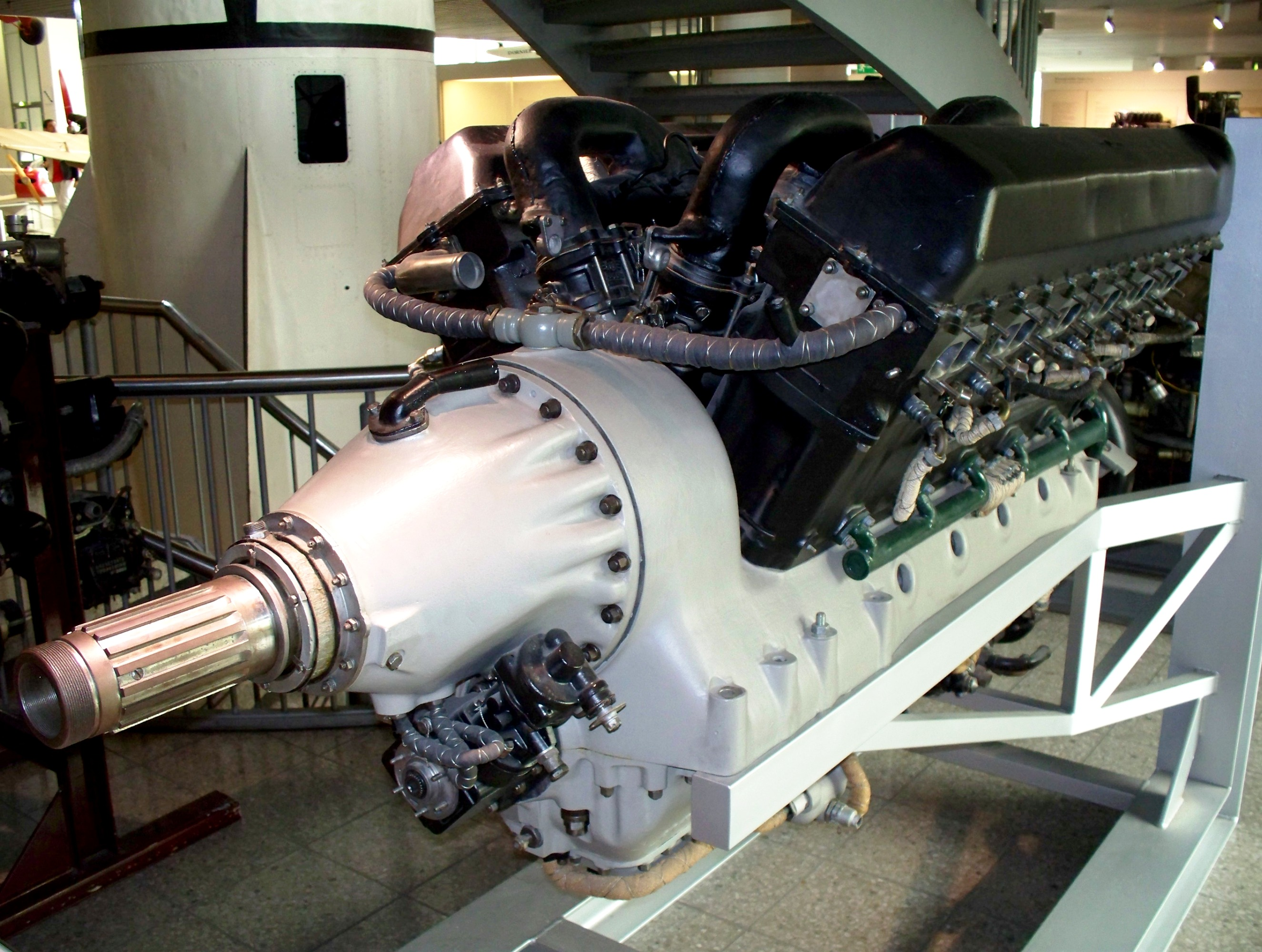
- Type: Liquid-cooled V12 piston engine
- National origin: USSR
- Manufacturer: Mikulin
- First run: November 1942
- Major applications: Ilyushin Il-10
- Number built: 10,232
- Developed from: Mikulin AM-38
- Developed into: Mikulin AM-43

The Mikulin AM-42 was a 1940s Soviet aircraft piston engine designed by Alexander Mikulin. Representing a high-output version of the AM-38F, the AM-42 was used in the Ilyushin Il-1 fighter, and the Il-8 and Il-10 ground attack aircraft.

== Design and development ==
The AM-42 was a low-altitude engine for attack aircraft that evolved from the earlier AM-38F. Compared to the AM-38F it had a reduced compression ratio, increased supercharging, strengthened and counterbalanced crankshaft, strengthened connecting rods, strengthened pistons and a revised oil system. The AM-42 was developed by the design bureau of Factory No. 24 now called the Salyut factory in Moscow. The first examples were produced in November 1942 and passed its 50-hour Factory tests in January 1943.

In September 1943 the AM-42 began State tests but these were unfinished due to piston damage while testing. A strengthened version of the AM-42 completed its State tests in spring 1944. The AM-42 was produced in large numbers between 1944–1948 and an improved 400 hour service life version was produced from 1951–1954. The majority of engines were produced at Factory No. 24 which was evacuated to Kuybyshev at the end of 1941.

10,232 engines were built by the time it was phased out of production in the USSR in 1954. In addition to being produced in the USSR it was also produced in Czechoslovakia as the M-42 at the Dimitrov factory to power the Avia B-33, a Czech built version of the Il-10.

== Variants ==
- AM-42TK: A version with a TK-300B turbo-supercharger.
- AM-42FNV: A fuel injected version.
- AM-42B-TK: A version with two TK-300B turbo-superchargers.
- AM-42FB-TK: A version with two TK-1A turbo-superchargers.

== Specifications (AM-42) ==
Data from Kotelnikov.

=== General characteristics ===
- Type: 60° V12 aircraft piston engine
- Bore: 160 mm (6.30 in)
- Stroke: 190 mm (7.48 in) and (196.7 mm (7.74 in) for cylinders with articulated connecting rods)
- Displacement: 46.66 L (2,847 in³)
- Dry weight: 996 kg (2,195 lb)

=== Components ===
- Supercharger: Single-speed GCS
- Cooling system: Liquid-cooled

=== Performance ===
- Power output: 1,490 kW (2,000 hp) at 2,500 rpm
- Specific power: 31.9 kW/L (0.70 hp/in³)
- Compression ratio: 5.5:1
- Power-to-weight ratio: 1.50 kW/kg (0.91 hp/lb)

== See also ==
Related development

- Mikulin AM-38

Comparable engines

- Daimler-Benz DB 603
- Junkers Jumo 213
- Klimov VK-107
- Rolls-Royce Griffon

Related lists

- List of aircraft engines
