= Artem Mikoyan =

Soviet aircraft designer (1905–1970)

- Արտյոմ Միկոյան
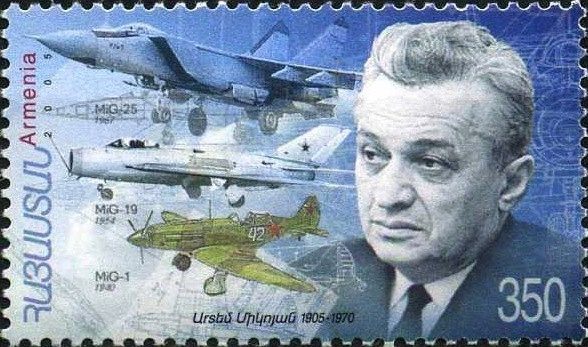
- Mikoyan on a 2005 stamp of Armenia
- Born: Artem Ivanovich Mikoyan; 5 August [O.S. 23 July] 1905; Sanahin, Tiflis Governorate, Russian Empire (present-day Armenia)
- Died: 9 December 1970 (aged 65); Moscow, Soviet Union
- Education: Zhukovsky Air Force Academy
- Engineering career
- Discipline: Aeronautical engineering
- Employer: Mikoyan-Gurevich design bureau
- Significant design: MiG-1; MiG-3; MiG-15; MiG-17; MiG-19; MiG-21; MiG-23; MiG-25
- Awards: Hero of Socialist Labor (twice); Stalin Prize (1941, 1947, 1948, 1949, 1952, 1953)

Artem (Artyom) Ivanovich Mikoyan (Russian: Артём Ива́нович Микоя́н; Armenian: Արտյոմ (Անուշավան) Հովհաննեսի Միկոյան, romanized: Artyom (Anushavan) Hovhannesi Mikoyan; 5 August [O.S. 23 July] 1905 – 9 December 1970), a Soviet-Armenian aircraft designer, co-founded the Mikoyan-Gurevich design bureau along with Mikhail Gurevich.

== Early life and career ==
Mikoyan was born to an Armenian family in the village of Sanahin, then part of the Tiflis Governorate of the Russian Empire (today part of Alaverdi in Armenia's Lori Province) on 5 August 1905. He was the brother of Anastas Mikoyan, who would later become a high level Soviet statesman. He completed his basic education and took a job as a machine-tool operator in Rostov, then worked in the "Dynamo" factory in Moscow before being conscripted into the military. After military service he joined the Zhukovsky Air Force Academy, where he created his first plane, graduating in 1936. He worked with Polikarpov before being named head of a new aircraft design bureau in Moscow in December 1939. Together with Mikhail Gurevich, Mikoyan formed the Mikoyan-Gurevich design bureau, producing a series of fighter aircraft. In March 1942, the bureau was renamed OKB MiG (Osoboye Konstruktorskoye Byuro), ANPK MiG (Aviatsionnyy nauchno-proizvodstvennyy kompleks) and OKO MiG. The MiG-1 proved to be a poor start, the MiG-3 went into production but only occasionally could it fight in its intended high-level interceptor role. The further MiG-5, MiG-7 and MiG-8 Utka did not progress beyond research prototypes.

== Jet aircraft designs ==
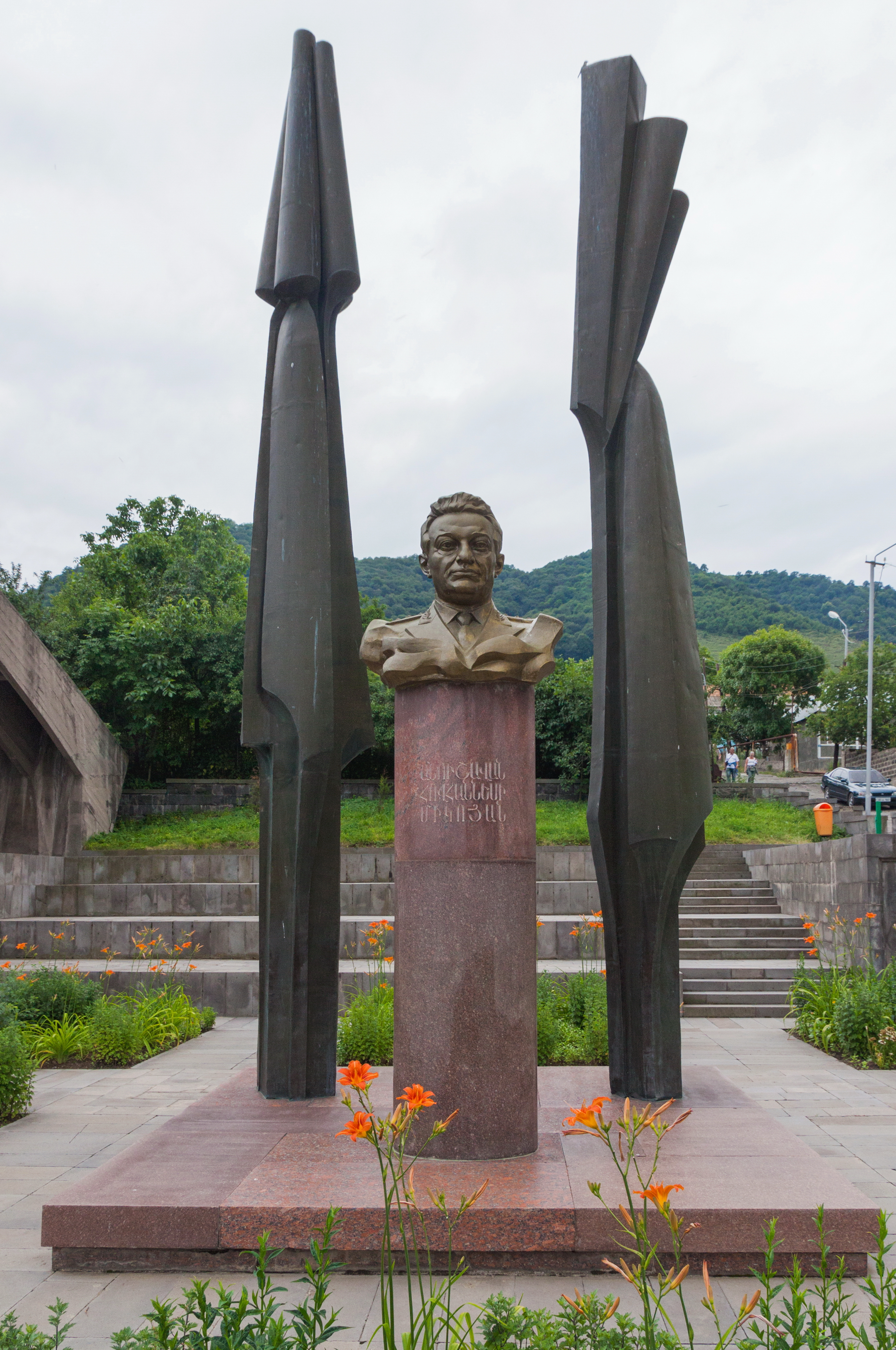
Artem Mikoyan monument. Mikoyan Brothers Museum in Sanahin, Armenia

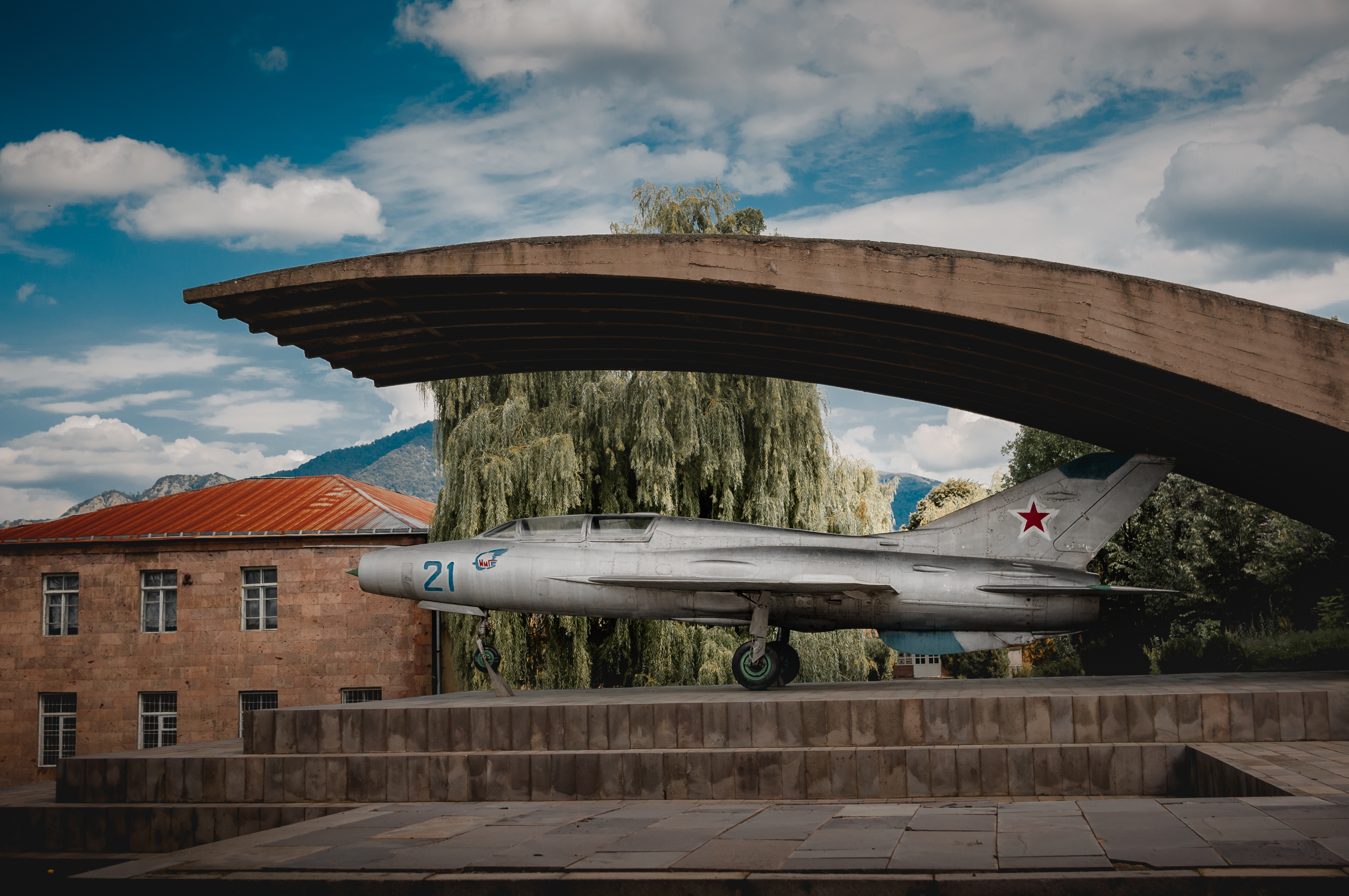
Memorial to Artem Mikoyan in Sanahin

Early post-war designs were based on domestic works as well as captured German jet fighters and information provided by Britain or the US. By 1946, Soviet designers were still having trouble in perfecting the German-designed, axial-flow BMW 109-003 jet engine — blueprints for the 109-003 turbojet had been seized by Soviet forces from the Basdorf-Zühlsdorf plant near Berlin and from the Central Works near Nordhausen. Production of the 003 was set up at the "Red October" GAZ 466 (Gorkovsky Avtomobilny Zavod, or Gorky Automobile Plant) in Leningrad, where the 003 jet engine was mass-produced from 1947 under the designation RD-20 (reaktivnyy dvigatel, or "jet engine"). New Soviet airframe designs from their design bureaus, and near-sonic wing designs were threatening to outstrip development of the jet engines needed to power them. Soviet aviation minister Mikhail Khrunichev and aircraft designer Alexander Sergeyevich Yakovlev suggested to Joseph Stalin that the USSR buy advanced jet engines from the British. Stalin is said to have replied: "What fool will sell us his secrets?" However, he gave his assent to the proposal, and Artem Mikoyan, engine designer Klimov, and other officials traveled to the United Kingdom to request the engines. To Stalin's amazement, the British Labour government and its pro-Soviet minister of trade, Sir Stafford Cripps were willing to provide technical information and a licence to manufacture the Rolls-Royce Nene centrifugal-flow jet engine. This engine was reverse-engineered and produced in modified form as the Soviet Klimov VK-1 jet engine, later incorporated into the MiG-15 (Rolls-Royce later attempted to claim £207 million in licence fees, without success).

In the interim, on 15 April 1947, the Council of Ministers issued a decree #493-192, ordering the Mikoyan OKB to build two prototypes for a new jet fighter. As the decree called for first flights as soon as December of that same year, the designers at OKB-155 fell back on an earlier troublesome design, the MiG-9 of 1946. The MiG-9 used a pair of the RD-20 Soviet copies of the BMW 003 for its power, which proved to be unreliable, with the airframe's straight-winged design suffering from control problems.

The prototype-only Mikoyan-Gurevich I-270 of the immediate post-war era was a rocket-powered, "straight-winged" point-defense fighter design based on captured examples of, and documentation for the never-produced German Messerschmitt Me 263, which had some influence on future MiG jet fighter designs. Thanks to the MiG OKB designing the very first airworthy swept-wing Soviet aircraft design of any type in 1945, the strictly experimental Mikoyan-Gurevich MiG-8 Utka canard pusher monoplane, the swept-wing research from it and captured German research documents allowed the Soviets to eventually develop the prototype design for the single-jet MiG-15 fighter, the I-310. With the Klimov VK-1 version of the British Nene jet engine, this design became the mass-produced MiG-15, which first flew on 31 December 1948, some fifteen months after the first prototype of its American swept-winged counterpart, the XP-86 Sabre first flew. Despite its mixed origins, this aircraft had excellent performance and formed the basis for a number of future fighters. The MiG-15 was originally intended to intercept American bombers such as the B-29 Superfortress, and was even evaluated in mock air-to-air combat trials with interned ex-U.S. B-29 bombers as well as the later Soviet B-29 copy, the Tupolev Tu-4. A variety of MiG-15 variants were built, but the most common was the MiG-15UTI (NATO 'Midget') two-seat trainer. Over 18,000 MiG-15s were eventually manufactured, then came the MiG-17, and MiG-19.

The MiG-15s were the jets used during the Korean War by Communist forces, and "MiG Alley" was the name given by U.S. Air Force pilots to the northwestern portion of North Korea, where the Yalu River empties into the Yellow Sea. During the Korean War, it was the site of numerous dogfights between U.S. fighter jets and those of the Communist forces, particularly the Soviet Union. The F-86 Sabre and the Soviet-built Mikoyan-Gurevich MiG-15 fighters were the aircraft used throughout most of the conflict, with the area's nickname derived from the latter. Because it was the site of the first large-scale jet-vs-jet air battles, MiG Alley is considered the birthplace of jet fighter combat.

== Later work ==
From 1952, Mikoyan also designed missile systems to particularly suit his aircraft, such as the famous MiG-21. He continued to produce high performance fighters through the 1950s and 1960s.

He was twice awarded the highest civilian honour, the Hero of Socialist Labor and was a deputy in six Supreme Soviets.

After Gurevich's death, the name of the design bureau was changed from Mikoyan-Gurevich to simply Mikoyan. However, the designator remained MiG. Many more designs came from the design bureau such as the MiG-23, MiG-29 and MiG-35 and variations.

After suffering from a stroke that occurred in 1969, Mikoyan died the following year and was buried in the Novodevichy Cemetery in Moscow.

== Honours and awards ==
Some of his awards and honours include:

- Twice Hero of Socialist Labour
- Six Orders of Lenin
- Order of the Red Banner
- Order of the Patriotic War 1st class
- Two Orders of the Red Star
- Lenin Prize (1962)
- USSR State Prize (1941, 1947, 1948, 1949, 1952, 1953)

== Memory ==
- A memorial plaque has been installed on House on the Embankment, where he was living.
- Postage stamps dedicated to Mikoyan have been issued in Armenia.
- There is an Aviakostruktora Mikoyana Street in Moscow, Ulan-Ude and Minsk district (Republic of Belarus).
- A school №166 in Armenia is named after him.
- In Orel, a memorial plaque dedicated to A. I. Mikoyan was installed on the building where the Orel Armored School was located.
- In 1996, Mikoyan was inducted into the International Air & Space Hall of Fame at the San Diego Air & Space Museum.
