= Mikulin AM-35 =

V12 piston aircraft engine

AM-35
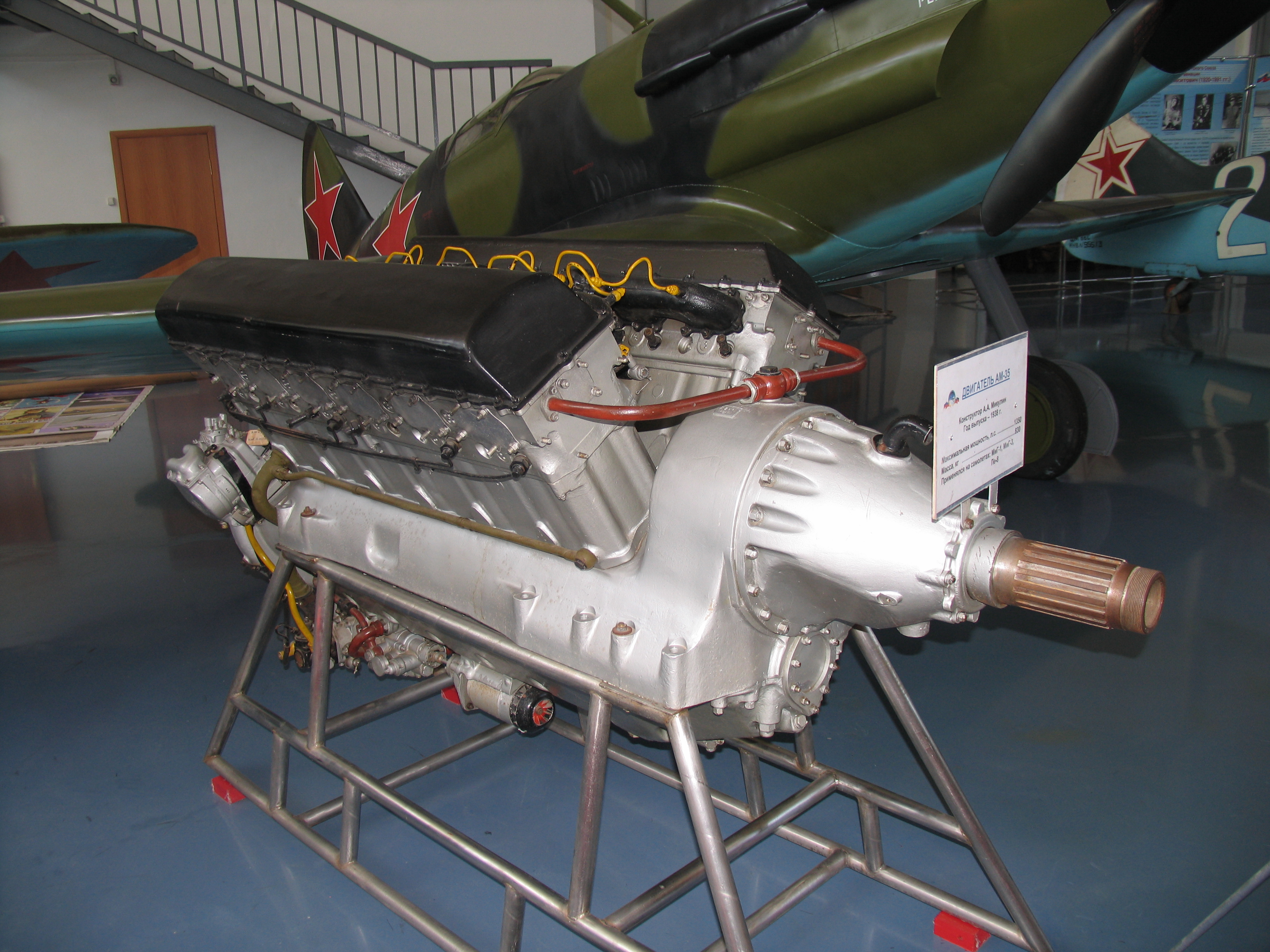
- Type: Liquid-cooled V12 piston engine
- National origin: USSR
- Manufacturer: Mikulin
- First run: March 1939
- Number built: 4,659
- Developed from: AM-34FRN
- Developed into: Mikulin AM-37 and Mikulin AM-38

The Mikulin AM-35 was a 1930s Soviet piston aircraft engine. Derived from the AM-34FRN, the AM-35 entered production in 1940 and was used on the MiG-1 and MiG-3 World War II fighters as well as the Petlyakov Pe-8 heavy bomber.

== Description ==
The AM-35 was a high-altitude engine for fighters and bombers that evolved from the earlier AM-34FRN. Compared to the AM-34FRN it had an improved cylinder block, strengthened crankcase, higher compression ratio and a single-speed geared centrifugal supercharger with variable incidence blades. The AM-35 was developed in 1938 at the design bureau of Factory No. 24 now called the Salyut factory in Moscow. In March 1939 the AM-35 successfully passed its Factory tests and in April 1939 it passed its State tests. However, the VVS was not satisfied with the engine due to its rated power of 1,300 horsepower, which was 200 horsepower less than the specified requirement. The AM-35 also used a single-speed supercharger instead of the two-speed supercharger specified. In order to obtain higher performance a new version the AM-35A was designed with greater supercharger output and this was produced in large numbers at Factory No. 24 until the end of 1941 when the factory was evacuated to Kuybyshev. Although formally phased out of production small numbers of replacement AM-35A engines were produced at Kuybyshev during 1942-43 from AM-38 parts. In total 4,659 AM-35 and AM-35A engines were produced.

A combination of factors led to the AM-35 being removed from production:

1. The majority of air combat on the Eastern Front took place at low-altitude and the AM-35 performed best at high-altitude.
2. Although having good high-altitude performance the MiG-3 was demanding to fly and a lack of experienced pilots led to high attrition through combat and accidents.
3. At low-altitude, the MiG-3 did not have a performance advantage over its opponents.
4. The MiG-3 had ineffective armament and efforts to increase its armament and recast it as a fighter-bomber failed.
5. The Petlyakov Pe-8 was never produced in large numbers and other engines such as the Charomskiy ACh-30, Charomskiy M-40, and Shvetsov ASh-82 were used instead.
6. The Ilyushin Il-2 was found to be better suited to the low-altitude ground-attack role than the MiG-3 so production of the MiG-3 was terminated. The AM-35 offered no advantage in the ground-attack role so production was switched to the AM-38 which was optimized for low-altitude performance.

== Variants ==
- AM-35NV: A fuel-injected version developed in October 1939.
- AM-35G: A version with ethylene glycol cooling.
- AM-35TK: A version with either TK-2 or TK-35 turbo-superchargers.
- AM-35A: The majority of engines produced were AM-35A's.
- AM-35ANV: A version with ethylene glycol cooling and fuel-injection. Tested but canceled in 1942.
- AM-35A-TR: A 1940 project with Efremov turbo-reactors.
- GAM-35FN: A project for a marine engine based on the AM-35.

== Specifications (AM-35A) ==
Data from Kotelnikov.

=== General characteristics ===
- Type: Piston V12 engine with 60° angle
- Bore: 160mm (6.3 in)
- Stroke: 190/196.7mm (7.48/7.74 in) different between right and left cylinder bank due to articulated connecting rods.
- Displacement: 46.66 L (2,847 in^{3})
- Length: 2,402 mm (94.5 in)
- Width: 866 mm (34.1 in)
- Height: 1,089 mm (42.9 in)
- Dry weight: 830 kg (1,830 lb)

=== Components ===
- Supercharger: Single-speed centrifugal type supercharger M-100 with aftercooler
- Cooling system: Liquid-cooled

=== Performance ===
- Power output: 993 kW (1,350 hp) at 2,050 rpm
- Specific power: 21.6 kW/L (0.47 hp/in^{3})
- Compression ratio: 7.0:1
- Specific fuel consumption: 0.46 kg/km (1.64 lb/mile) calculated, 0.38 kg/km (1.35 lb/mile) observed.
- Power-to-weight ratio: 1.21 kW/kg (0.74 hp/lb)

== Applications ==
- MiG-1
- MiG-3
- Petlyakov Pe-8

== See also ==
Related development

- Mikulin AM-37
- Mikulin AM-38

Comparable engines

- Allison V-1710
- Daimler-Benz DB 601
- Junkers Jumo 211
- Klimov VK-105
- Rolls-Royce Merlin

Related lists

- List of aircraft engines
