= Mikulin AM-38 =

Aircraft engine

AM-38
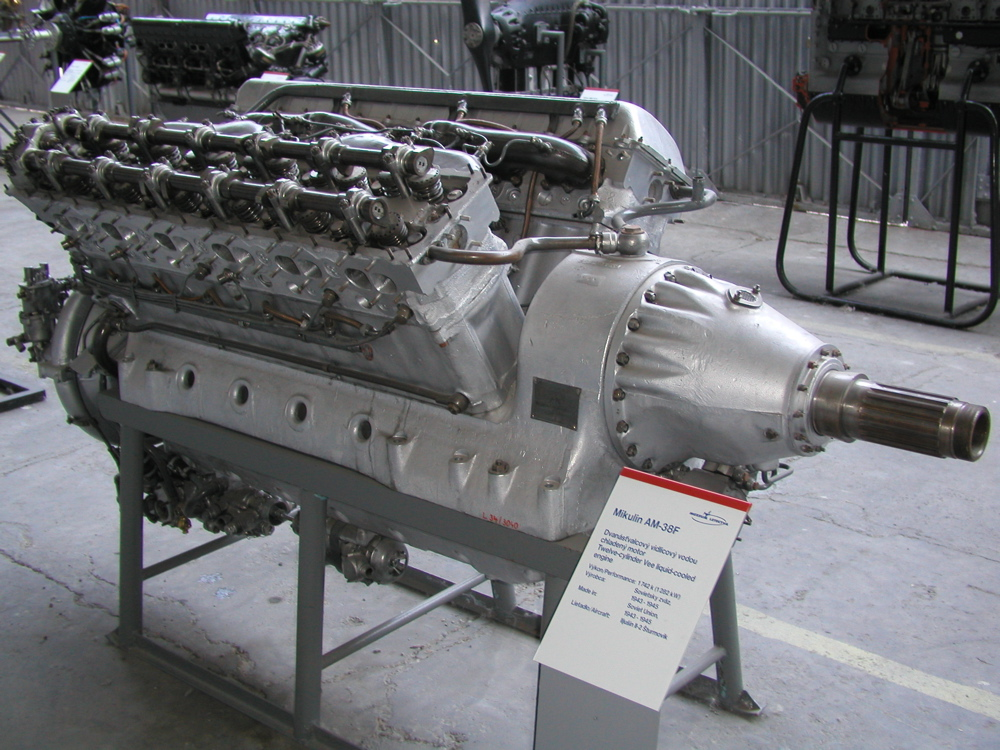
- Preserved Mikulin AM-38F engine
- Type: Liquid-cooled V12 piston engine
- National origin: USSR
- Manufacturer: Mikulin
- First run: 1941
- Major applications: Ilyushin Il-2
- Number built: 43,191
- Developed from: Mikulin AM-35
- Developed into: Mikulin AM-42

The Mikulin AM-38 was a 1940s Soviet aircraft piston engine. It was a further development of the Mikulin AM-35 design. The AM-38 was used on the Il-2 Shturmovik and Il-10 ground attack aircraft. The AM-38 was installed experimentally in a MiG-3 and tested during August 1941. A slight performance improvement was seen at low-altitude but the engine experienced overheating problems due to the cooling and oil systems remaining unchanged from the AM-35A.

== Description ==
The AM-38 was a low-altitude engine for ground attack aircraft that evolved from the earlier AM-35A. Compared to the AM-35A it had a reduced compression ratio, strengthened crankshaft, a single-speed geared centrifugal supercharger optimized for low-altitude performance, revised cooling system and revised oil system. The AM-38 was developed by the design bureau of Factory No. 24 now called the Salyut factory in Moscow. The first examples were produced in October 1939 and passed its Factory tests in November 1939. The AM-38 was placed in production at the start of 1941 despite not passing its State tests until July 1941. The majority of engines were produced at Factory No. 24 which was evacuated to Kuybyshev at the end of 1941. In June 1942 production also began at Factory No. 45 which used the former workshops of Factory No. 24 in Moscow. The AM-38 was the most produced Mikulin engine with 43,191 built by the time it was phased out of production in 1946.

== Variants ==
- AM-38F: A version with higher RPM for takeoff and a 10-minute forsazh (war emergency power) mode. It also had an oil centrifuge, strengthened camshafts, strengthened cylinder block, strengthened inlet valves and cylinder heads made from a new alloy. The diameter of the GCS impeller was also reduced and its compression ration was lowered to accommodate lower quality fuel. Series production began in at Factory No. 24 in October 1942 and Factory No. 45 in 1943. The engine did not pass the State test until May 1943.
- GAM-38F: A proposed marine version of the AM-38F.

== Specifications (AM-38F) ==
Data from Kotelnikov.

=== General characteristics ===
- Type: 12-cylinder 60° V aircraft piston engine
- Bore: 160 mm (6.30 in)
- Stroke: 190 mm (7.48 in) (196.7 mm (7.74 in) for cylinders with articulated connecting rods)
- Displacement: 46.66 L (2,847 cu in)
- Dry weight: 880 kg (1,940 lb)

=== Components ===
- Supercharger: Single-speed geared centrifugal supercharger
- Cooling system: Liquid-cooled

=== Performance ===
- Power output: 1,270 kW (1,700 hp) at 2,350 rpm
- Specific power: 27.2 kW/L (0.60 hp/in^{3})
- Compression ratio: 6.0:1
- Power-to-weight ratio: 1.53 kW/kg (0.93 hp/lb)

== Applications ==
- Ilyushin Il-2
- Ilyushin Il-10

== See also ==
Related development

- Mikulin AM-35
- Mikulin AM-42

Related lists

- List of aircraft engines
