= Mikoyan =

Aircraft manufacturer in Russia

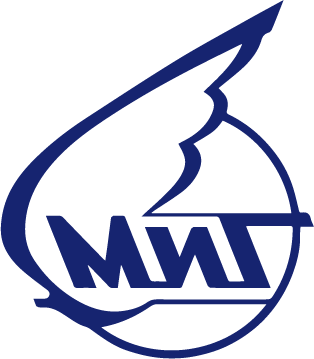

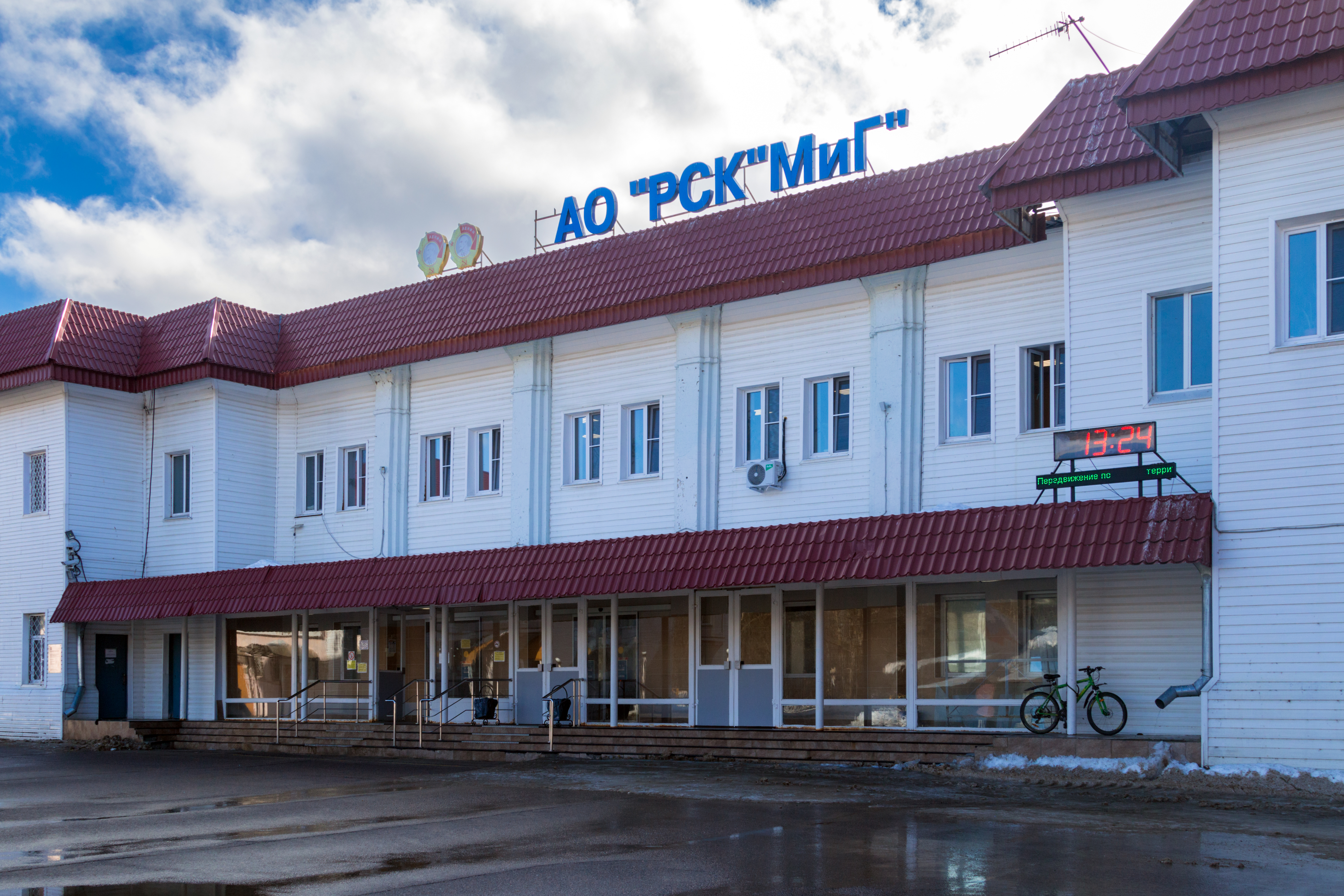
- Company headquarters
- Formerly: OKB-155; Mikoyan and Gurevich Design Bureau
- Type: Division
- Industry: Aerospace manufacturer and defense
- Founded: 8 December 1939; 86 years ago
- Founders: Mikhail Gurevich; Artem Mikoyan
- Fate: merged into United Aircraft Corporation
- Headquarters: Leningradsky Prospekt, Moscow, Russia
- Products: Military aircraft Civil airliners Unmanned aerial vehicles
- Revenue: $1.37 billion (2017)
- Operating income: $27 million (2017)
- Net income: $8.59 million (2017)
- Total assets: $3.58 billion (2017)
- Total equity: −$302 million (2017)
- Number of employees: 10,090 (2013)
- Parent: United Aircraft Corporation
- Website: www.uacrussia.ru/en

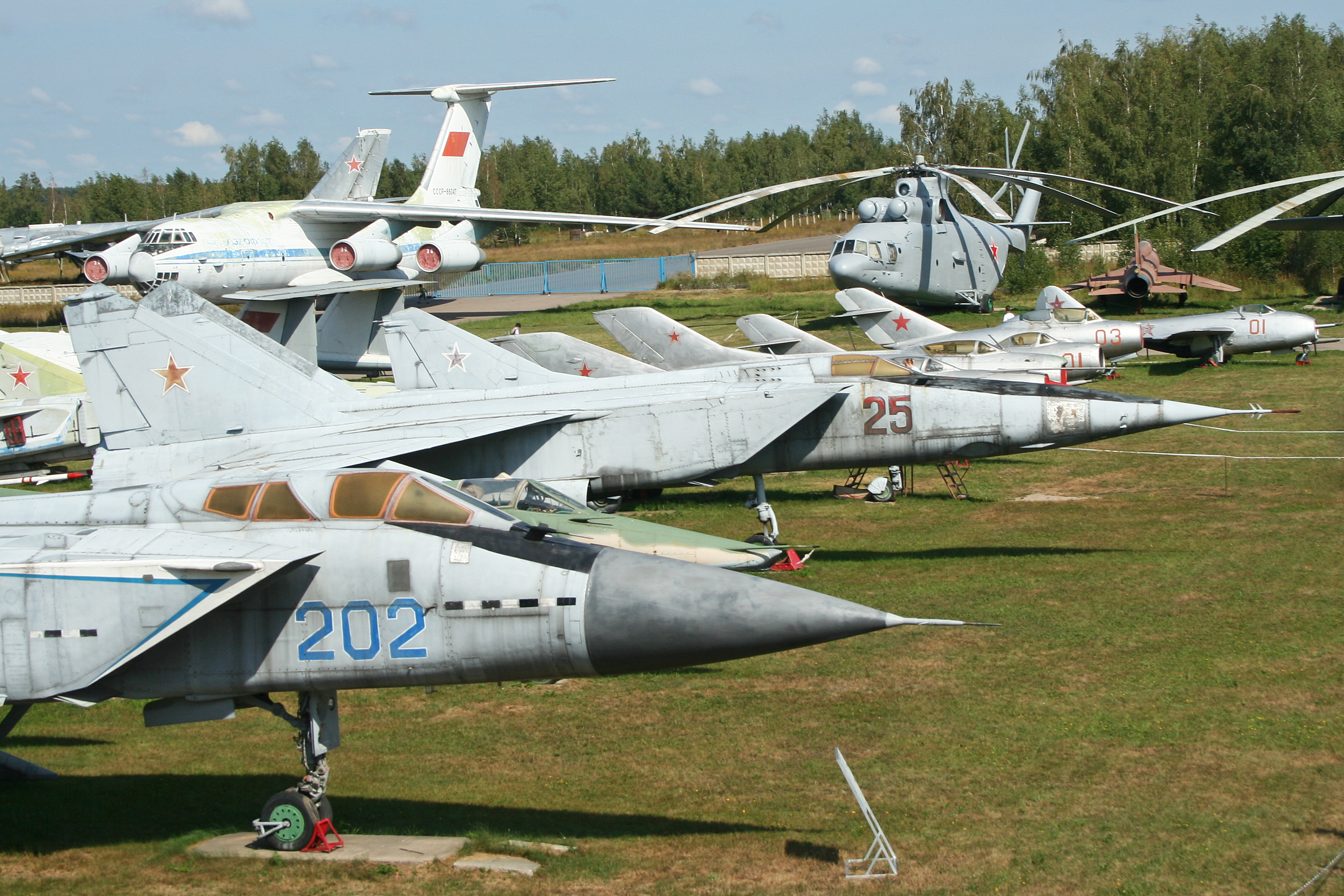
Various MiG fighter aircraft, from MiG-31 to MiG-9 at Central Air Force Museum Monino

Russian Aircraft Corporation "MiG" (Russian: Российская самолётостроительная корпорация „МиГ“, romanized: Rossiyskaya samolyotostroitel'naya korporatsiya "MiG"), commonly known as Mikoyan and MiG, is a Russian aerospace and defence company headquartered in Begovoy District, Moscow.

Mikoyan was the successor to the Soviet Mikoyan and Gurevich Design Bureau (Микоя́н и Гуре́вич, МиГ; OKB-155 design office prefix MiG) founded in 1939 by aircraft designers Artem Mikoyan and Mikhail Gurevich. Mikoyan were notable for their fighter and interceptor aircraft which became a staple of the Soviet Air Force and Russian Air Forces, nations within the Soviet sphere of influence, and other nations such as India and many Arab states. Mikoyan aircraft were frequently used in aerial confrontations with American and allied forces during and since the Cold War, and have become commonly featured aircraft in popular culture. Mikoyan aircraft were the most produced jet fighter family.

In 2006, Mikoyan became a division of the United Aircraft Corporation in a merger with Ilyushin, Irkut, Sukhoi, Tupolev, and Yakovlev by decree of the Russian president Vladimir Putin.

== History ==
Mikoyan was established on 8 December 1939 as the Pilot Design Department of the Aviation Plant #1 and headed by Artem Mikoyan and Mikhail Gurevich. It was later renamed "Experimental Design Bureau named after A.I. Mikoyan" otherwise known as the Mikoyan Design Bureau or Mikoyan OKB. In 1964 Gurevich retired, and Mikoyan died in 1970. He was succeeded by Rostislav A. Belyakov, and in 1978 the enterprise was named after Mikoyan.

In 1995, Mikoyan OKB was merged with two production facilities to form the Moscow Aviation Production Association "MiG" (MAPO-MiG). In the 1990s MiG began developing Mikoyan Project 1.44, a fifth-generation jet fighter, but the project was hampered by a lack of funding and was eventually canceled.

In December 1999, Nikolai Nikitin was appointed the corporation's General Director and General Designer. Nikitin focused most of the company's resources on the development of the Tu-334 passenger aircraft at the expense of military programs. This prompted the resignation in December 1999 of many of its leading military aircraft designers, including the chief designers and their deputies for the MiG-29 and MiG-31 programs.

Nikitin was replaced by Valery Toryanin in November 2003, who was in turn replaced by Alexey Fedorov in September 2004. In 2006, the Russian government merged 100% of Mikoyan shares with Ilyushin, Irkut, Sukhoi, Tupolev, and Yakovlev as a new company named United Aircraft Corporation. Specifically, Mikoyan and Sukhoi were placed within the same operating unit.

MiG failed to win any major aircraft tenders in the post-Soviet era, falling behind its Russian rival Sukhoi. According to press reports, the company was shedding hundreds of employees in late 2017 due to a shortage of orders.

As of 2015 the company's business offering consists mostly of modernized MiG-29 aircraft. MiG was developing a 4++ fighter, the MiG-35, with the first deliveries expected in late 2019. Mikoyan was set to fly the PAK DP aka MiG-41 their first stealth interceptor in 2025. However as of 2026, the aircraft is still under development.

== Activity ==
The company specializes in the production of military aircraft. The Russian government has issued licenses to RSC MiG for the development, production and technical support of civil and military aviation equipment.

The total volume of production of MiG brand aircraft by domestic aircraft factories is about 47 thousand copies, and taking into account licensed production — about 62 thousand copies. The volume of production of cruise missiles developed at the Design Bureau and its branch at plant No. 256 (now JSC GosMKB Raduga named after A. Ya. Bereznyak) amounted to more than 12 thousand copies.

The company's revenue in 2009 amounted to 24.4 billion rubles. The company's order book reached $6.8 billion in April 2010.

In 2014, JSC RSC MiG was named the winner of the third competition "Aircraft Manufacturer of the Year" in two nominations: "For the creation of a new scientific model of a physical phenomenon or technological process" and "For successes in the development of aviation equipment and components" (OKB of the year).

Since June 1, 2022, it has been part of the association of PJSC UAC JSC RSK MiG, as well as JSC Sukhoi Company.

== See also ==
- List of Mikoyan and MiG aircraft
- List of military aircraft of the Soviet Union and the CIS
