= List of Russian aerospace engineers =

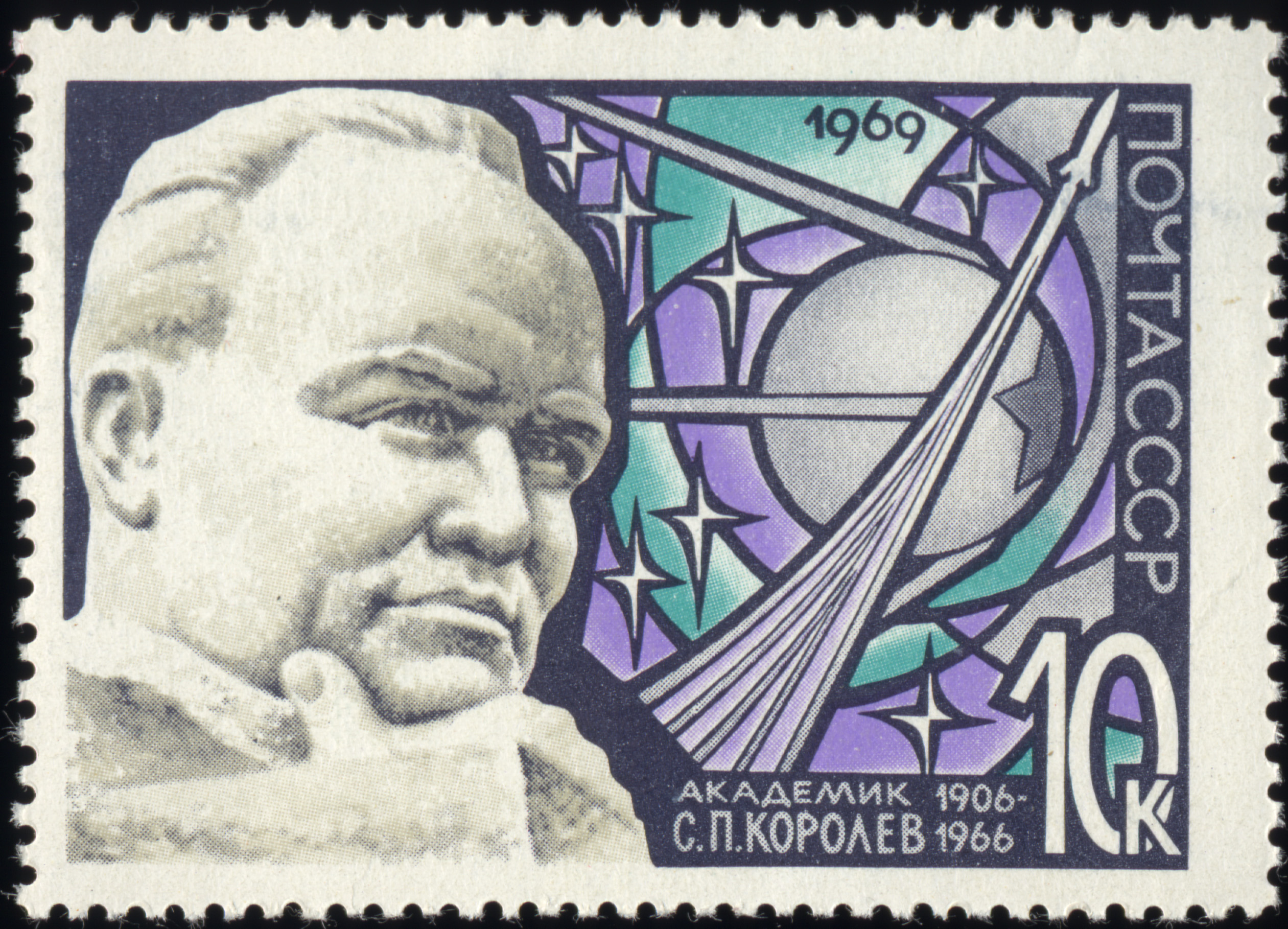
Sergei Korolyov, the key man in the Soviet space program

This list of Russian aerospace engineers includes the designers of aircraft, rocketry and spacecraft, and developers of auxiliary aerospace technologies from the Russian Empire, the Soviet Union and the Russian Federation.

See also the Category:Russian aerospace engineers.

== Alphabetical list ==
=== A ===
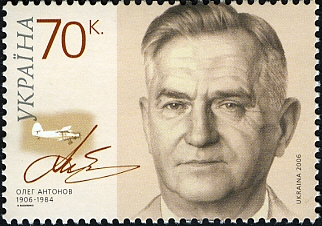
Antonov

- Rostislav Alexeyev, designer of high-speed hydrofoils (raketa) and ekranoplans, including the Caspian Sea Monster
- Oleg Antonov, designer of the An-series aircraft, including A-40 winged tank and An-124 (the largest serial cargo, later modified to world's largest fixed-wing aircraft An-225)
- Alexander Arkhangelsky, designer of the Ar-series aircraft
- Yuri Artsutanov, pioneered the idea of the space elevator

=== B ===
- Georgy Babakin, designer of the first soft landing space vehicle Luna 9
- Vladimir Barmin, designer of the world's first rocket launch complex (Baikonur spaceport)
- Robert Bartini, developer of ekranoplans and VTOL amphibious aircraft, physicist, tutor to many other aerospace designers
- Alexander Bereznyak, designer of the first rocket-powered fighter aircraft, BI-1
- Georgy Beriev, designer of the Be-series amphibious aircraft
- Georgy Bothezat, inventor of the quadrotor helicopter, The Flying Octopus

=== C ===
- Vladimir Chelomey, designer of the first space station Salyut 1, creator of Proton rocket (the most used heavy lift launch system)
- Boris Ivanovich Cheranovsky, creator of the world's first flying wing aircraft
- Boris Chertok, major Soviet rocket designer; author of the four-volume book Rockets and People, the definitive source on the history of the Soviet space program
- Evgeniy Chertovsky, inventor of the pressure suit

=== F ===
- Nicolas Florine, builder of the first successful tandem rotor helicopter

=== G ===
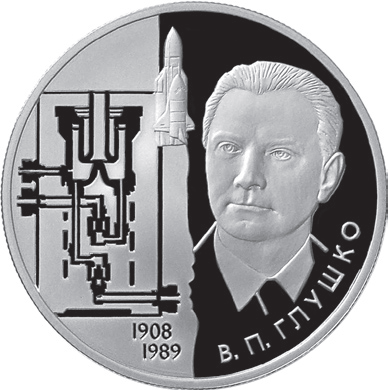
Glushko

- Valentyn Glushko, inventor of hypergolic propellant and electric propulsion; designer of the world's most powerful liquid-fuel rocket engine RD-170
- Dmitry Grigorovich, designer of the Grigorovich-series aircraft, including the first flying boat
- Pyotr Grushin, inventor of anti-ballistic missile
- Mikhail Gurevich, designer of the MiG-series fighter aircraft, including world's most produced jet aircraft MiG-15 and most produced supersonic aircraft MiG-21

=== I ===
- Sergey Ilyushin, designer of the Il-series fighter aircraft, including Il-2 bomber (the most produced military aircraft in history)
- Andronik Iosifyan, chief electrician of Soviet missiles and spacecraft, including the R-7 Semyorka and the Soyuz spacecraft
- Aleksei Isaev, designer of the first rocket-powered fighter aircraft, BI-1

=== K ===
Kotelnikov

- Nikolay Kamov, designer of the Ka-series coaxial rotor helicopters
- Mstislav Keldysh, developer of the first satellite (Sputnik) and Keldysh bomber
- Alexander Kemurdzhian, inventor of the first space exploration rover Lunokhod
- Kerim Kerimov, the secret figure behind the Soviet space program
- Nikolai Kibalchich, pioneer of rocketry; the International Astronomical Union honoured him by naming a crater on the moon Kibal'chich
- Sergei Korolyov, "the Father of the Soviet space program", inventor of the first intercontinental ballistic missile and the first space rocket (R-7 Semyorka), creator of the first satellite (Sputnik), supervisor of the first human spaceflight
- Gleb Kotelnikov, inventor of the knapsack parachute and drogue parachute

=== L ===
- Semyon Lavochkin, designer of the La-series aircraft and the first operational surface-to-air missile S-25 Berkut
- Mikhail Lomonosov, polymath scientist and artist, inventor of coaxial rotor and the first model helicopter
- Gleb Lozino-Lozinskiy, designer of the Buran space shuttle and Spiral project
- Arkhip Lyulka, designer of the Lyulka-series aircraft engines, including the first double jet turbofan engine

=== M ===
- Victor Makeev, developer of the first intercontinental SLBM
- Artem Mikoyan, designer of the MiG-series fighter aircraft, including world's most produced jet aircraft MiG-15 and most produced supersonic aircraft MiG-21

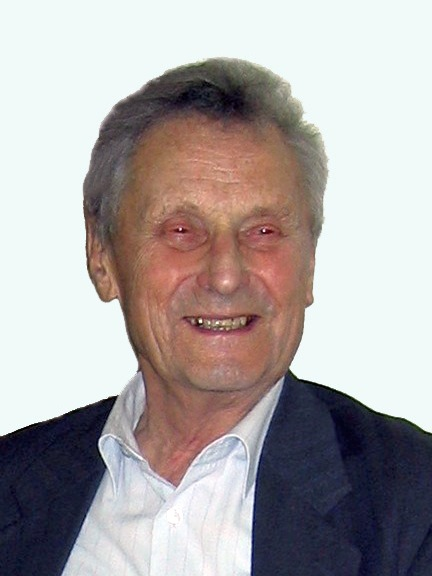
Mironov

- Arseny Mironov, scientist in flight dynamics and aircraft safety, Stalin Prize recipient (1948) for the new method of aerodynamic research, USSR State Prize recipient (1976) for the completion of flight testing of the Su-24 fighter-bomber
- Alexander Mikulin, designer of Mikulin AM-34 and other Soviet aircraft engines; co-developer of the Tsar Tank
- Mikhail Mil, designer of the Mi-series helicopters, including Mil Mi-8 (the world's most-produced helicopter) and Mil Mi-12 (the world's largest helicopter)
- Pavel Molchanov, inventor of radiosonde
- Alexander Mozhaysky, author of the first attempt to create heavier-than-air craft in Russia; designed the largest of 19th century airplanes
- Vladimir Myasishchev, founder of the Myasishchev Design Bureau

=== N ===
- Alexander Nadiradze, designer of the first mobile ICBM RT-21 Temp 2S and the first reliable mobile ICBM RT-2PM Topol

=== P ===
- Vladimir Petlyakov, designer of the Pe-series military aircraft
- Nikolay Pilyugin, chief designer of Soviet rocket guidance systems
- Mikhail Pogosyan, designer of Sukhoi aircraft, including SSJ100, Su-47, Su-57 and Su-30 series
- Nikolai Polikarpov, designer of the Po-series aircraft, including Po-2 Kukuruznik (world's most produced biplane)
- Alexander Procofieff de Seversky, inventor of ionocraft and gyroscopically stabilized bombsight

=== S ===
- Guy Severin, designer of the first extra-vehicular activity supporting system
- Boris Shavyrin, inventor of air-augmented rocket
- Igor Sikorsky, inventor of airliner and strategic bomber (Ilya Muromets), father of modern helicopter, designer of the Sikorsky-series helicopters
- Mikhail Simonov, chief designer of the Su-27 fighter jet, as well as Su-24 and Su-25 military aircraft
- Boris Stechkin, co-developer of Sikorsky Ilya Muromets and Lebedenko's Tsar Tank, designer of many heat and aircraft engines
- Pavel Sukhoi, designer of the Su-series fighter aircraft
- Vladimir Syromyatnikov, designer of the Androgynous Peripheral Attach System

=== T ===
- Mikhail Tikhonravov, designer of Sputniks, including the first artificial satellite Sputnik 1
- Max Taitz, scientist in aerodynamics, theory of jet engines and flight testing of aircraft, one of the founders of the Gromov Flight Research Institute
- Konstantin Tsiolkovsky, principal pioneer of astronautics, designed an early wind tunnel
- Alexei Tupolev, designer of the Tu-series aircraft, including the first supersonic transport Tu-144
- Andrey Tupolev, designer of the Tu-series aircraft, including the turboprop long-range airliner Tu-114 and turboprop strategic bomber Tu-95

=== U ===
- Vladimir Utkin, designer of the first railcar-launched ICBM RT-23 Molodets

=== V ===
- Vladimir Vakhmistrov, supervisor of Zveno project (the first bomber with parasite aircraft)

=== Y ===
- Alexander Yakovlev, designer of the Yak-series aircraft, including the first regional jet Yak-40

=== Z ===
- Friedrich Zander, designed the first liquid-fuel rocket in the Soviet Union, GIRD-X, pioneer of astronautics
- Nikolai Zhukovsky, founder of modern aero- and hydrodynamics; pioneer of aviation in Russia; designer of an early wind tunnel and co-developer of the Tsar Tank

== See also ==
- List of aerospace engineers
- List of most produced aircraft
- List of Russian inventors
- Aircraft industry of Russia
- Defence industry of Russia
- Imperial Russian Air Force
- Soviet Air Force
- Russian Air Force
- Soviet space program
- Russian Space Agency
