= Arkhangelsky =

Arkhangelsky (masculine), Arkhangelskaya (feminine), or Arkhangelskoye (neuter) may refer to:

== People ==
- Arkhangelsky (surname)

== Places ==
- Arkhangelsky District, a district in the Republic of Bashkortostan, Russia
- Arkhangelsky (rural locality) (Arkhangelskaya, Arkhangelskoye), name of several rural localities in Russia
- Arkhangelsk Oblast (Arkhangelskaya oblast), a federal subject of Russia
- Arkhanhelske, Donetsk Oblast, a village in Ukraine
- Arkhanhelske, Kherson Oblast, a village in Ukraine

== Other uses ==
- Arkhangelskoye Palace, a historical estate near Moscow, Russia
- Arkhangelski, a Soviet military design bureau led by Alexander Arkhangelsky
- Arkhangelsky Ar-2, a bomber designed by this design bureau
- Arkhangelsky (crater), a crater on Mars named after him

== See also ==
- Arkhangelsk
- Archangel (disambiguation)
- Arkhanhelske
