= Lebedenko =

Lebedenko (Ukrainian: Лебеденко) is a surname of Ukrainian origin that may refer to:

- Igor Lebedenko (born 1983), Russian footballer
- Nikita Lebedenko, Soviet general
- Nikolay Lebedenko, 20th century Russian military engineer
- Oleksandr Lebedenko (born 1989), Ukrainian footballer
- Orest Lebedenko (born 1998), Ukrainian footballer
- Yelena Lebedenko (born 1971), Russian heptathlete

== See also ==
- Lebedenco, a commune in Moldova
- Lebedenko tank
