= Mitrofan Cioban =

Moldovan mathematician (1942–2021)

Mitrofan Cioban (5 January 1942 – 2 February 2021) was a Moldovan mathematician specializing in topology. He taught primarily at Tiraspol State University, and he was a member of the Academy of Sciences of Moldova and a president of the Mathematical Society of the Republic of Moldova.

== Early life and education ==
Cioban was born in Copceac (then in Tighina County, Romania, now in Ștefan Vodă District, Moldova), the fourth child out of seven of farmers Mihail and Tecla Cioban. At age 17 he enrolled in the Faculty of Mathematics and Physics of Tiraspol State University. After one year Cioban transferred to Moscow State University, where he started attending the Topology seminar of Pavel Alexandrov. He obtained his PhD in 1969 with thesis Properties of Quotient Mappings and Classification of Spaces written under the direction of Alexander Arhangelskii. Despite initially not knowing Russian, German, or English, he became well-versed in mathematical literature in these languages.

== Academic and professional career ==
Upon graduation, Cioban returned in 1970 to Tiraspol State University as a faculty member, where he directed 17 PhD theses and served as prorector and then rector.

He published over 200 papers in academic journals from 1966 to 2020, mostly under the names of Choban or Čoban, and occasionally Cioban, Ciobanu, or Coban. Starting from 1999, he served as president of the Mathematical Society of the Republic of Moldova, with headquarters in Chișinău. Cioban supervised 22 PhD students and 4 doctors for their habilitation in mathematics.

== Scientific contributions ==
Cioban helped found the Moldovan school of general topology and made substantial contributions to the areas of topology and topological algebra, descriptive set theory, functional analysis, optimization theory, and measure theory. He published his first major result in 1966 in Proceedings of the USSR Academy of Sciences, in which he generalized a theorem of Arthur Harold Stone on the metrizability of quotient spaces.

== Death ==
Cioban died from COVID-19 on 2 February 2021 in Chișinău during the COVID-19 pandemic in Moldova.

== Publications ==
- Chaber, Józef; Čoban, Mitrofan; Nagami, Keiô (1974). "On monotonic generalizations of Moore spaces, Čech complete spaces and p-spaces". Fundamenta Mathematicae. 84 (2): 107–119. doi:10.4064/fm-84-2-107-119. MR 0343244.
- Arhangel'skii, Alexander V.; Choban, Mitrofan M. (2010). "Remainders of rectifiable spaces". Topology and Its Applications. 157 (4): 789–799. doi:10.1016/j.topol.2009.08.028. MR 2585412.
