= Arkhangelsky (surname) =

Arkhangelsky, feminine: Arkhangelskaya is a Russian surname originated in clergy, derived from the word archangel. Notable people with the surname include:

- Aleksei Arkhangelsky (1986-), Russian football player
- Alexander Arhangelskii (1938–), Russian mathematician
- Aleksandr Arkhangelsky (1892–1978), Russian Soviet aircraft designer
- Alexander Arkhangelsky (composer) (1846–1924), Russian composer
- Andrey Arkhangelsky (1879–1940), Russian Soviet geologist
- Olga Arkhangelskaya (born 1981), Russian badminton player
- Sergio Archangelsky (1931–2022), Argentine paleobotanist and palynologist
- Vitaly Arkhangelsky (1975–), Russian shipping and insurance magnate
