= Tupolev ANT-29 =

ANT-29

General information
- Type: Twin-engined cannon fighter
- National origin: Soviet Union
- Manufacturer: Tupolev
- Designer: Alexander Arkhangelsky
- Number built: 1

History
- First flight: February 1935
- Developed from: Tupolev ANT-21

The Tupolev ANT-29 (military designation DIP – Dvukhmotorny istrebitel pushechny, "twin-engined cannon fighter") was a 1930s twin-engined, cannon-armed fighter designed by Alexander Arkhangelsky and built by Tupolev.

Design work started in 1932 on a twin-engined aircraft capable of carrying two APK-100 cannon. The resulting design was the ANT-29 and it first flew in February 1935.It was a monoplane with a tall and narrow fuselage, powered by two Hispano-Suiza 12Ybrs engines. The cannon were mounted at the bottom of the fuselage, and unusually they were accessible to the crew in flight for loading and maintenance. During tests the machine had reasonable performance but was longitudinally unstable. The aircraft did not enter production.

== Specifications ==
Data from

General characteristics

- Crew: three
- Length: 13.2 m (43 ft 4 in)
- Wingspan: 19.19 m (62 ft 11 in)
- Wing area: 55.1 m^{2} (593 sq ft)
- Empty weight: 3,900 kg (8,598 lb)
- Gross weight: 5,300 kg (11,684 lb)
- Powerplant: 2 × Hispano-Suiza 12Ybrs , 760 kW (1,019 hp) each

Performance

- Maximum speed: 352 km/h (219 mph, 190 kn)

Armament

- One moveable machine gun
- Two recoilless cannon
