= Arkhanhelske =

Arkhanhelske, from "Архангельське", also transliterated as "Arkhangelske", may refer to the following:

- Arkhanhelske, Donetsk Oblast, a village in Ukraine
- Arkhanhelske, Kherson Oblast, a village in Ukraine

== See also ==
- Arkhangelsky, a name similarly originating from the word archangel
