= Arkhangelski =

- Industry: Aerospace
- Founded: 1940
- Defunct: 1941
- Fate: Merged into Tupolev
- Key people: Alexander Arkhangelsky
- Products: Military aircraft

The Arkhangelsky Design Bureau was a short-lived Soviet military aircraft design bureau headed by Alexander Arkhangelsky. Formerly working for Andrei Tupolev, Arkhangelsky became the leader of Tupolev's design bureau after Tupolev was arrested in 1938 during the Great Purge and was tasked to develop a dive-bomber version of the Tupolev SB (the Arkhangelsky Ar-2). The bureau resumed its original name when Tupolev was released from prison after the Axis powers invaded the Soviet Union in June 1941.

== Aircraft ==
- Arkhangelsky Ar-2

== Bibliography ==
- Gunston, Bill (1995). The Encyclopedia of Russian Aircraft 1875–1995. Osceola, Wisconsin: Motorbooks International. ISBN 0-7603-0027-5.
