= Giedymin =

Giedymin may refer to

- Gediminas (1275-1341), monarch of Lithuania
- Jerzy Giedymin (1925–1993), a Polish philosopher and historian of mathematics and science
