= Tupolev ANT-21 =

ANT-21 (MI-3)

General information
- Type: Fighter
- National origin: Soviet Union
- Manufacturer: Tupolev
- Number built: 2

History
- First flight: 1933
- Developed from: Tupolev ANT-7
- Developed into: Tupolev ANT-29

The Tupolev ANT-21 was a Soviet twin-engined four-seat heavy fighter, which also had the designation MI-3 (Mnogomestnyi Istrebitel – Multi-seat fighter). It was not accepted for production, only two prototypes being built.

== Design and development ==
In January 1932, the Soviet Air Forces ordered the TsAGI design bureau led by Andrei Tupolev to design a twin-engined multi-seat fighter to replace the KR-6 escort fighter version of the Tupolev ANT-7 twin-engined multi-purpose aircraft. Tupolev assigned design of the new fighter to a team led by Alexander Arkhangelsky. This was Arkhangelsky's first project as chief designer. The resulting aircraft, the ANT-21, was like the ANT-7, a monoplane, with its corrugated all-metal wings based on those of the ANT-7, but having reduced span, and with the corrugations covered in fabric to reduce drag. The oval-section fuselage was a new design, being a partially flush riveted semi-monocoque structure made of duralumin, a first for Tupolev aircraft, and it was fitted with a twin tail. It also had a retractable tailwheel undercarriage, novel for the time.

The aircraft's pilot sat in an open cockpit above the leading edge of the wing. One gunner sat in the nose operating two machine guns, a second gunner sat in a dorsal position with two more machine guns, while another crewman operated a ventral gun, firing through a hatch. Two fixed machine guns could be operated by the pilot. Two Mikulin M-17 engines powered the ANT-21, as used by the ANT-7.

The first prototype, officially designated MI-3 and nicknamed Mitrich made its maiden flight in August 1933. Initial testing was successful, the ANT-21 being popular with its test pilots, but when being dived at nearly 400 km/h (250 mph), severe flutter was encountered in the aircraft tail, with the starboard rudder breaking off and the aircraft making a heavy landing.

As a result of this accident, Arkhangelsky redesigned the aircraft, retaining the wings, but providing a new fuselage and tail, with a single vertical fin. The crew were accommodated in enclosed cockpits, with the nose gunner operating a single 20mm cannon or a heavy machine gun and the ventral gun being omitted, while the dorsal gunner's armament and the fixed guns operated by the pilot were unchanged. The M-17 engines of the first prototype were replaced by more powerful and modern M-34Ns. The new aircraft, the ANT-21bis or MI-3D (Doubler – understudy) was completed in April 1934. Despite the new tail, it suffered tail vibration at certain power settings which resulted in the addition of tail-bracing struts. It was officially tested during July–December 1934, but was not accepted for service by the Soviet Air Force, as it now wanted fighters armed with heavy recoilless rifles, and interest switched to the Tupolev ANT-29 derivative.

== Specifications (ANT-21D) ==
Data from The Osprey Encyclopedia of Russian Aircraft 1975–1995

General characteristics

- Crew: three
- Length: 11.57 m (38 ft 0 in)
- Wingspan: 20.76 m (68 ft 1 in)
- Wing area: 59.2 m^{2} (637 sq ft)
- Empty weight: 4,058 kg (8,946 lb)
- Gross weight: 5,463 kg (12,044 lb)
- Powerplant: 2 × M-34N liquid-cooled V12 engine, 610 kW (820 hp) each

Performance

- Maximum speed: 350 km/h (220 mph, 190 kn) at 5,000 m (16,400 ft)
- Service ceiling: 8,300 m (27,200 ft)

Armament

- Guns: 1 × 20 mm cannon in flexible mounting in nose, 2 × fixed forward-firing 7.62×54mmR PV-1 machine gun and 2 × Degtyaryov machine guns in dorsal position
