= Boris Stechkin =

Russian scientist (1891–1969)

- Борис Стечкин
- Born: Boris Sergeyevich Stechkin; 5 August 1891; Trufanovo village, Aleksinsky Uyezd, Tula Governorate, Russian Empire
- Died: 2 April 1969 (aged 77); Moscow, Soviet Union
- Occupation: Engineer
- Awards: Hero of Socialist Labour; Two Orders of Lenin; Lenin Prize; Stalin Prize, 2nd class

Boris Sergeyevich Stechkin (Russian: Борис Сергеевич Стечкин; 5 August 1891 – 2 April 1969) was a Russian and Soviet scientist, engineer and inventor. He developed a theory of heat engines and was involved in construction of many Soviet aircraft engines. He was also co-developer of Sikorsky’s Ilya Muromets (the first four-engine airplane and bomber, 1913) and Lebedenko's Tsar Tank (the largest armored vehicle in history, 1916–1917). He died in Moscow on 2 April 1969.

== Awards and honours ==
- Hero of Socialist Labour (5 August 1961)
- Two Orders of Lenin (24 January 1947; 5 August 1961)
- Order of the Red Banner of Labour (2 July 1945)
- Order of the Red Star (18 August 1945)
- Lenin Prize (1957) – for creating the Tu-104 plane
- Stalin Prize, 2nd class (1946) – for creating a new type of aircraft engine and radical improvement of an existing engine
- Medal "For the Victory over Germany in the Great Patriotic War 1941–1945"
- Medal "For Valiant Labour in the Great Patriotic War 1941–1945"
- Medal "In Commemoration of the 800th Anniversary of Moscow" (1947)

== See also ==
- List of Russian inventors
