= Copceac, Ștefan Vodă =

Copceac
- Village
- Location within Moldova
- Coordinates: 46°27′01″N 29°31′15″E
- Country: Moldova

Government
  - Mayor: Vasile Țînțari (PLDM)

Area
  - Total: 50.67 km^{2} (19.56 sq mi)
- Elevation: 71 m (233 ft)

Population (2014 census)
  - Total: 2,264
- Time zone: UTC+2 (EET)
  - Summer (DST): UTC+3 (EEST)
- Postal code: MD-4217

Copceac is a village in Ștefan Vodă District, Moldova.

== Natives ==
- Mitrofan Cioban (1942 – 2021), mathematician
