= Jerzy Giedymin =

Polish philosopher

Jerzy Giedymin (September 18, 1925 – June 24, 1993) was a philosopher and historian of mathematics and science.

== Life ==
Giedymin, of Polish origin, was born in 1925.

He studied at the University of Poznań under Kazimierz Ajdukiewicz. In 1953 Jerzy Giedymin succeeded Adam Wiegner at the Chair of Logic at the Faculty of Philosophy.

The so-called Poznań School was a Marxist current of philosophy marked by an idealisational theory of science which emphasised the scientific features of Marxism in close confrontation with contemporary logic and epistemology.

In 1968 Giedymin moved to England and attended seminars by Karl Popper at the London School of Economics.

In 1971 he came to Sussex to become Professor at the School of Mathematical and Physical Sciences of the University of Sussex.

Giedymin died during a trip to Poland on 24 June 1993.

== Work ==
Giedymin was convinced that Henri Poincaré's conventionalist philosophy was fundamentally misunderstood and thus underestimated. Giedymin argues that Poincaré was at the origin of much of the 20th century's innovations in relativity theory and quantum physics.

Giedymin's standpoint was much influenced by his exposure to Kazimierz Ajdukiewicz's perception of the history of ideas which in defiance of traditional empiricism reviews the philosophy of science of the early 20th century in the light of pragmatic conventionalism.

== Bibliography ==
=== Books ===
- Jerzy Giedymin, Z problemow logicznych analizy historycznej [Some Logical Problems of Historical Analysis], Poznanskie towarzystwo przyjaciol nauk. Wydzial filologiczno-filozoficzny. Prace Komisji filozoficznej. tom 10. zesz. 3., Poznań, 1961.
- Jerzy Giedymin, Problemy, zalozenia, rozstrzygniecia. Studia nad logicznymi podstawami nauk spolecznych [Questions, assumptions, decidability. Essays concerning the logical functions of the social sciences], Polskie Towarzystwo Ekonomiczne. Oddzial w Poznaniu. Rozprawy i monografie. No. 10, Poznań, 1964.
- Jerzy Giedymin ed., Kazimierz Ajdukiewicz: The scientific world-perspective and other essays, 1931-1963, Dordrecht: D. Reidel Publishing Co., 1974 ISBN 90-277-0527-5
- Jerzy Giedymin, Science and convention: essays on Henri Poincaré’s philosophy of science and the conventionalist tradition, Oxford: Pergamon, 1982 ISBN 0-08-025790-9

=== Articles (selection) ===
- Jerzy Giedymin, "Confirmation, critical region and empirical content of hypotheses", in Studia Logica, Volume 10, Number 1 (1960)
- Jerzy Giedymin, "A generalization of the refutability postulate", in Studia Logica, Volume 10, Number 1 (1960)
- Jerzy Giedymin, "Authorship hypotheses and reliability of informants", in Studia Logica, Volume 12, Number 1 (1961)
- Jerzy Giedymin, "Reliability of Informants", in British Journal for the Philosophy of Science, XIII (1963)
- Jerzy Giedymin, "The Paradox of Meaning Variance", in British Journal for the Philosophy of Science, 21 (1970)
- Jerzy Giedymin, "Consolations for the Irrationalist", in British Journal for the Philosophy of Science, 22 (1971)
- Jerzy Giedymin, "Antipositivism in Contemporary Philosophy of Social Sciences and Humanities", in British Journal for the Philosophy of Science, 26 (1975)
- Jerzy Giedymin, "On the origin and significance of Poincaré's conventionalism", in Studies in History and Philosophy of Science, Vol.8, No.4 (1977)
- Jerzy Giedymin, "Revolutionary changes, non-translatability and crucial experiments", in Problems of the Philosophy of Science, Amsterdam: North Holland, 1968
- Jerzy Giedymin, "The Physics of the Principles and Its Philosophy: Hamilton, Poincaré and Ramsey", in Science and Convention: Essays on Henri Poincaré's Philosophy of Science and the Conventionalist Tradition. Oxford: Pergamon (1982)
- Jerzy Giedymin, "Geometrical and Physical Conventionalism of Henri Poincaré in Epistemologial Formulation", in Studies in History and Philosophy of Science, 22 (1991)
- Jerzy Giedymin, "Conventionalism, the Pluralist Conception of Theories and the Nature of Interpretation", in Studies in History and Philosophy of Science, 23 (1992)
- Jerzy Giedymin, "Radical Conventionalism, Its Background and Evolution: Poincare, Leroy, Ajdukiewicz", in Vito Sinisi & Jan Wolenski (ed.), The Heritage of Kazimierz Ajdukiewicz, Amsterdam, Rodopi, 1995 ISBN 90-5183-808-5
- Jerzy Giedymin, "Ajdukiewicz's Life and Personality", in Vito Sinisi & Jan Wolenski (ed.), The Heritage of Kazimierz Ajdukiewicz, Amsterdam, Rodopi, 1995 ISBN 90-5183-808-5
- Jerzy Giedymin, "Strength, Confirmation, Compatibility", in Mario Bunge (ed.), in Critical Approaches to Science and Philosophy (Science and Technology Studies). Piscataway, N.J.:Transaction Publishers (1998)

=== About Jerzy Giedymin ===
- Laurent Rollet, Le conventionnalisme géométrique de Henri Poincaré : empirisme ou apriorisme ? Une étude des thèses de Adolf Grünbaum et Jerzy Giedymin, Université de Nancy 2, 1993
- Laurent Rollet, "The Grünbaum-Giedymin Controversy Concerning the Philosophical Interpretation of Poincaré's Geometrical Conventionalism" in Krystyna Zamiara (ed.) The Problems Concerning the Philosophy of Science and Science Itself, Poznań, Wydawnictwo Fundacji Humaniora (1995)
- Krystyna Zamaria, "Jerzy Giedymin – From the Logic of Science to the Theoretical History of Science", in Wladyslaw Krajewski (ed.), Polish Philosophers of Science and Nature in the 20th Century, Amsterdam, 2001 ISBN 90-420-1497-0
