= Core of a locally compact space =

In topology, the core of a locally compact space is a cardinal invariant of a locally compact space $X$, denoted by $\operatorname{cor}(X)$. Locally compact spaces with countable core generalize σ-compact locally compact spaces.

The concept was introduced by Alexander Arhangel'skii.

== Core of a locally compact space ==
Let $X$ be a locally compact and Hausdorff space. A subset $S \subseteq X$ is called saturated if it is closed in $X$ and satisfies $S \cap P \neq \emptyset$ for every closed, non-compact subset $P \subseteq X$.

The core $\operatorname{cor}(X)$ is the smallest cardinal $\tau$ such that there exists a family $\gamma = (\gamma_j)$ of saturated subsets of $X$ satisfying: $|\gamma| \leq \tau$ and $\bigcap_j \gamma_j = \emptyset$.

A core is said to be countable if $\operatorname{cor}(X) \leq \omega$. The core of a discrete space is countable if and only if $X$ is countable.

=== Properties ===
- The core of any locally compact Lindelöf space is countable.
- If $X$ is locally compact with a countable core, then any closed discrete subset $H$ of $X$ is countable. That is the extent
  $$e(X) = \{Y : Y \text{ is a closed discrete subset of } X\}$$
  is countable.
- Locally compact spaces with countable core are σ-compact under a broad range of conditions.
- A subset $Y$ of $X$ is called compact from inside if every subset $F$ of $Y$ that is closed in $X$ is compact.
- A locally compact space $X$ has a countable core if there exists a countable open cover of sets that are compact from inside.
