= Tupolev SB =

1934 Soviet bomber aircraft

ANT-40 / SB
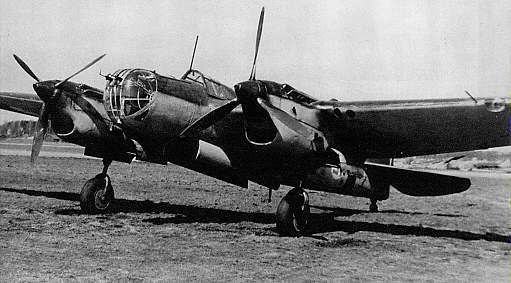
- Finnish captured SB

General information
- Type: Fast bomber
- Manufacturer: Tupolev
- Designer: Alexander Arkhangelsky
- Primary users: Soviet Air Forces Czechoslovak Air Force; Chinese Nationalist Air Force; Luftwaffe
- Number built: 6,656

History
- Manufactured: 1936–1941
- Introduction date: 1936
- First flight: 7 October 1934
- Retired: 1950 (Spanish Air Force)
- Variant: Tupolev ANT-35
- Developed into: Arkhangelsky Ar-2

The Tupolev ANT-40, also known by its service name Tupolev SB (Russian: Скоростной бомбардировщик – Skorostnoi Bombardirovschik – high speed bomber) and development co-name TsAGI-40, was a high speed twin-engined three-seat monoplane bomber, first flown in 1934. The Tupolev design was advanced but lacked refinement, much to the dismay of crews, maintenance personnel, and Stalin, who pointed out that "there are no trivialities in aviation".

Numerically the most important bomber in the world in the late 1930s, the SB was the first modern stressed skin aircraft produced in quantity in the Soviet Union and probably the most formidable bomber of the mid-1930s. It was produced in the Soviet Union and was also built under license in Czechoslovakia. Many versions saw extensive action in Spain, the Republic of China, Mongolia, Finland and at the beginning of World War II against Germany in 1941. It was also used in various duties in civil variants, as trainers and in many secondary roles. Successful in the Spanish Civil War because it outpaced most fighters present (composed mostly of biplanes), the aircraft was obsolete by 1941 as faster fighters (such as the Bf-109) had by then been introduced. By June 1941, 94 percent of bombers in the Red Army air force (Soviet Air Force (VVS) Red Army (RKKA) were SBs.

== Development ==
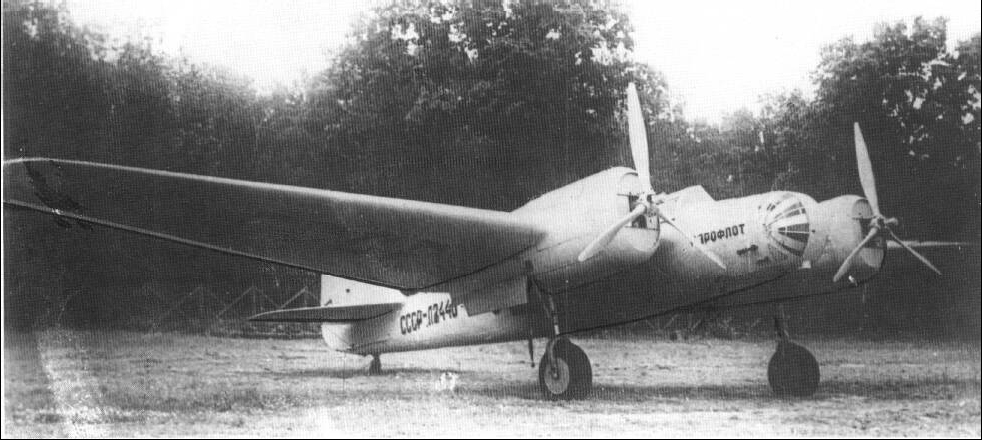
Aeroflot Tupolev ANT-40.

In 1933 the Soviet Air Force ministry (UVVS) issued an outline requirement for a high-speed bomber. Work on this proposal at TsAGI began in January 1934. The SB was designed and developed in the Tupolev KB ("Design Bureau") by a team led by A. A. Arkhangelski. Two versions were planned, one with Wright Cyclone radial engines (ANT-40 RTs), and one with the Hispano-Suiza 12Y liquid-cooled V12 engines (ANT-40 IS). The skills gained in the design of the MI-3 and DI-8 aircraft were widely used. The first two prototypes were called ANT-40.1 and ANT-40.2. The Cyclone powered prototype flew first, on 7 October 1934, while the first Hispano-Suiza powered prototype (ANT-40_{1}), which featured a larger wing, flew on 30 December 1934, demonstrating superior performance.

The second Hispano-Suiza powered aircraft, the ANT-40_{2} was considered a production prototype, and its performance was impressive but it was plagued by teething problems, leading unhappy test personnel to cover the ANT-40_{2} with placards listing the aircraft's defects prior to a visit by Sergo Ordzhonikidze, the Commissar for Heavy Industry. On seeing these placards, Ordzhonikidze summoned Tupolev to a meeting at the Kremlin to discuss these shortfalls. When Tupolev stated that most of the defects were trivial, Joseph Stalin said,

There are no trivialities in aviation; everything is serious and any uncorrected 'triviality' could lead to the loss of an aircraft and its crew.

The first production aircraft, designated SB, rolled off the production line before the end of 1935, and before ANT-40_{2} had completed its flight test programme. The aircraft entered full production in 1936, and was produced in two plants, State Aircraft Factory No 22 at Moscow and No 125 at Irkutsk until 1941.

Despite the fact that the assembly lines were plagued with a constant string of modifications, some 400 SBs were delivered by the end of 1936—a number of these being diverted to Spain—and 24 Soviet Air Forces (VVS) squadrons were in the process of working up with the new bomber. Giving excellent performance in the Spanish Civil War, it acquired the popular name "Katyusha" (Catherine).

In 1937, negotiations were concluded between the Soviet and Czechoslovak governments, for the supply of SB bombers and a licence for local production, in exchange for the right to produce the Škoda 75 mm Model 1936 mountain gun. The version of the SB to be supplied to, and subsequently license-built as the Avia B-71 was the SB 2M-100A but fitted with the Avia-built Hispano-Suiza 12-Ydrs engine. A 7.92 mm vz. 30 machine gun supplanted the twin ShKAS machine guns in the nose and similar weapons were provided for the dorsal and ventral stations. Sixty aircraft were to be flown to Czechoslovakia by mid-1938. The planned licensed production program took a decidedly leisurely course, despite the increasingly dangerous political situation. By 15 March 1939, when the German Wehrmacht occupied Bohemia and Moravia, not one Czech-built aircraft had been delivered.

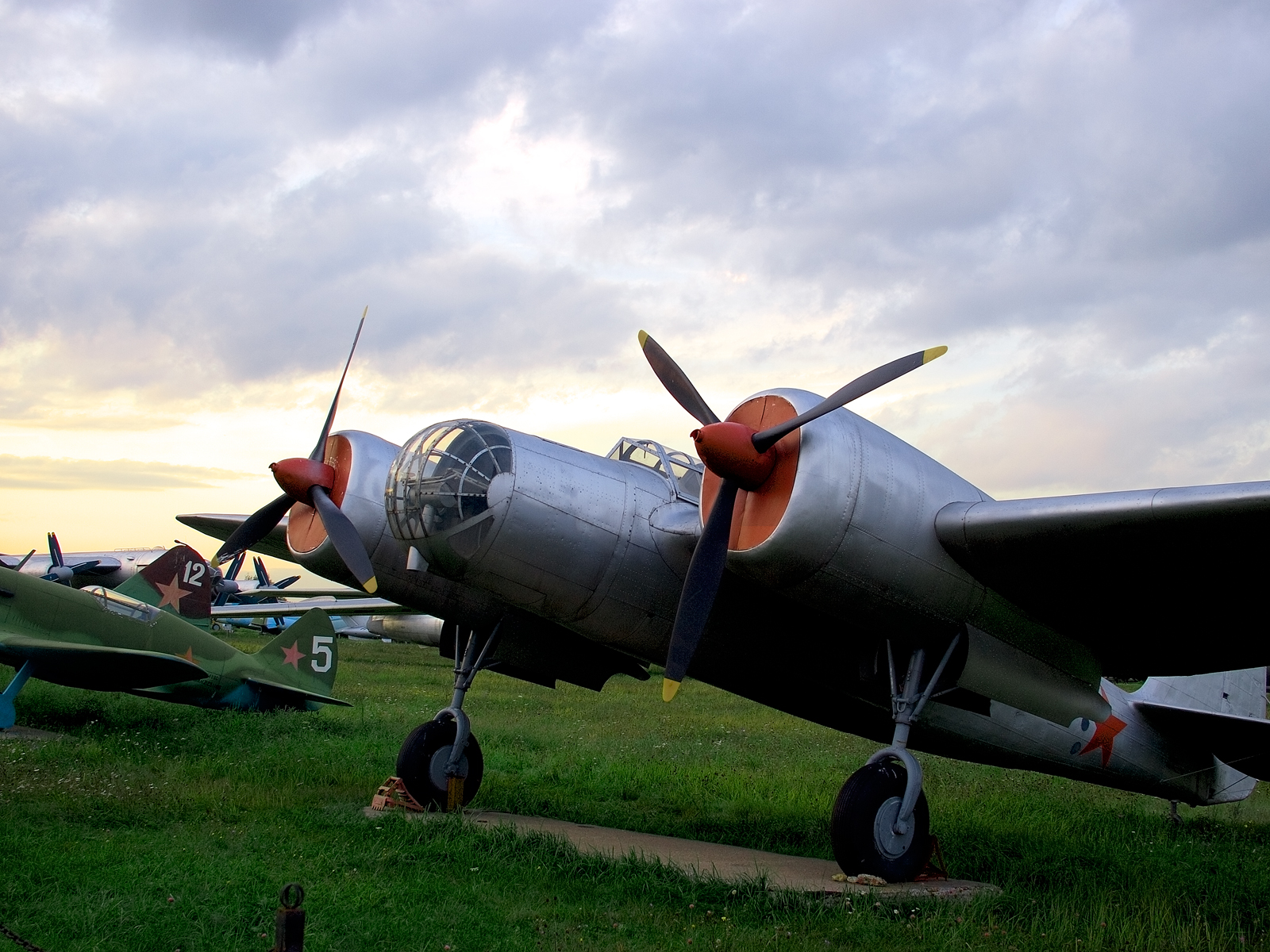
Tupolev SB in Monino Air Force Museum

Development of the SB continued with revisions being made to reflect the lessons of early operations in Spain. As problems were encountered in converting pilots to fly the SB, a trainer version, the USB was built in September 1937, with a modified nose with an open cockpit for an instructor and dual controls. Problems were also encountered with the armament, the nose guns having limited traverse and so being little use against head-on attacks and later aircraft were modified with a better field of fire. From 1940, the dorsal gun position was replaced by an enclosed turret, while the ventral gun position, which was difficult to use, was also modified.

The aircraft was also progressively fitted with improved engines. At first it was equipped with the Klimov M-100, a license-built version of the Hispano-Suiza 12Ybrs engine, but this was soon replaced by the more powerful M-100A, and from 1938 by the yet more powerful M-103. While the engine installation of the SB 2-M103 initially retained the drag inducing frontal radiators of the M-100 powered aircraft, an improved engine installation was developed with the radiators slung under the engines. On 2 September 1937 M.Yu. Alexeev set an official altitude record of 12,246 m (40,177 ft) with load of 1,000 kg (2,200 lb) in an M-103 powered SB. He had earlier set an unofficial record of 12,695 m (41,650 ft).

In an attempt to further improve the performance of the SB, which by 1939 was becoming obsolete, the development of two second-generation versions were authorised, a direct replacement for the SB and a specialised dive bomber. The level bomber, known as the SN-MN or MMN, had a new wing of reduced wing area and was powered by more powerful Klimov M-105 engines. Performance was little better than the standard aircraft and it was abandoned. The dive-bomber, SB-RK (later renamed Arkhangelsky Ar-2 after its designer, with Tupolev having been imprisoned and being in disgrace) was similar to the MMN but was fitted with dive brakes and it was ordered into production.

Even though the SB was no longer a state of the art aircraft, production continued to increase through 1939 and 1940, as the Soviet Union tried to build up the strength of their air forces to compete with the growing threat of Nazi Germany, with almost 4,000 being built in these two years. The SB was phased out of production in early 1941, being replaced by the Petlyakov Pe-2. A total of 5,695 were built at Factory No 22 at Moscow before it was evacuated to Kazan, while Factory No 125 built a further 1,136 at Irkutsk. Three prototypes were built at the Tupolev design bureau, while Aero Vodochody and Avia in Czechoslovakia built 45 and 66 respectively, giving a total of 6,945 built.

== Design ==
The SB was an all-metal monoplane powered by two Klimov M-100 12-cylinder water-cooled engines (license production version of Hispano-Suiza 12-Yrds engine) which drove fixed-pitch two-bladed metal propellers. The engines were provided with honeycomb-type frontal radiators enclosed by vertical thermostat-controlled cooling shutters. At an early production stage, the M-100 engine gave place to an improved M-100A engine, driving ground-adjustable three-pitch propellers, with speed being boosted to 423 km/h (263 mph) at 4,000 m (13,000 ft). Because of its broad, high aspect ratio wing, that gave it a good altitude performance – Soviet crews nicknamed the SB the "Pterodactyl".

== Operational history ==
There were a number of foreign customers for the SB. They were mostly satisfied with the aircraft's performance. There were some complaints about the noise, cramped crew compartments, hard undercarriage suspension and in particular about the front gunner's position, which could be reached only through a hatch under the fuselage, preventing the gunner from escaping in the event of a ditching or belly landing. Czechoslovakia signed an agreement to produce the ANT-40 as Avia B-71.

=== Spanish Civil War ===
While only 54 SBs had been delivered to the Soviet Air Forces by 1 July 1936, this did not stop the new Tupolev bomber being amongst the first shipments of military equipment sent by the Soviet Union to support the Spanish Republicans when the Spanish Civil War broke out on 17 July 1936. An initial batch of 31 SBs arrived in Cartagena aboard the Soviet Freighter Komsomol in October 1936, flying their first mission, a bombing raid by four SBs against Tablada airfield, Seville on 28 October. The SBs were used to equip Grupo 12 of the Spanish Republican Air Force, which at first was mainly manned by Soviet volunteers and under Soviet control.

The SB could outpace the Fiat CR.32 and Heinkel He 51 biplane fighters of the nationalist forces, and was therefore difficult to intercept, with dives from high altitude being the only way to intercept the SB. On 29 May 1937 two SBs attacked the German pocket battleship Deutschland, mistaking it for the Nationalist cruiser Canarias, killing 31 and injuring an additional 83 German sailors. In June–July, a second consignment of 31 SBs were received, allowing Grupo 12 to return to full strength, and a new unit, Grupo 24, to be established. The delivery of Messerschmitt Bf 109s to re-equip the German Condor Legion meant that the SB could no longer evade Nationalist fighters by sheer speed, and losses rose.

A third and final batch of 31 SBs arrived in June 1938, allowing operations to continue, although losses continued to be high. By the time the Civil War ended in April 1939, 73 SBs had been lost, 40 of them to enemy action. Nineteen SBs were taken over by the Nationalists, and used to form a bomber squadron. Although some were re-engined with French Hispano-Suiza 12Ybrs engines to aid maintenance, they were still subject to spares shortages, and in April 1943 only three were airworthy. When Junkers Ju 88s were received in December 1943, the remaining SBs were used for occasional training flights until withdrawn and scrapped in 1948.

=== China ===
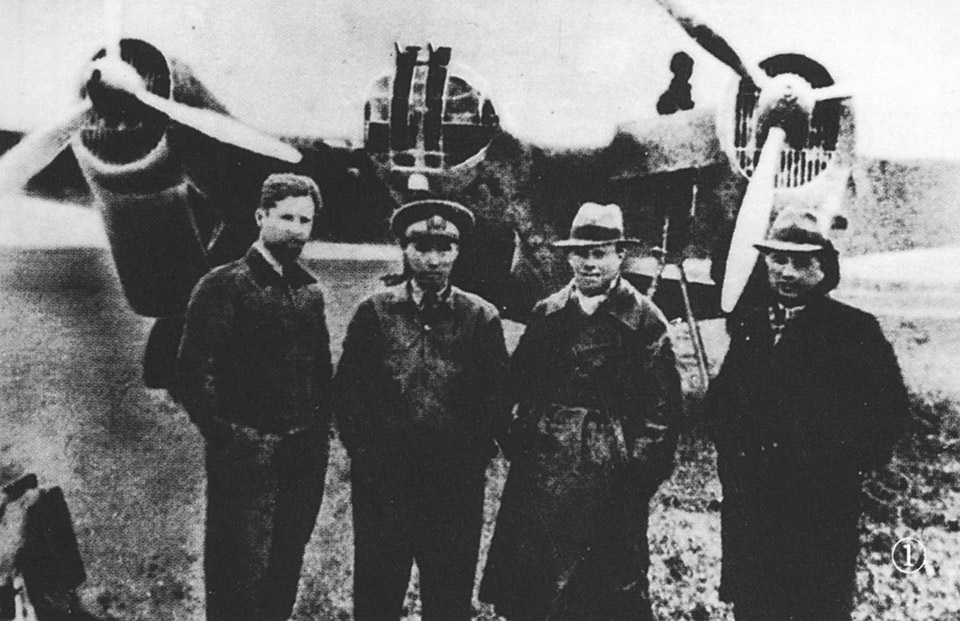
Soviet aviators at Hankou airfield.

In July 1937, the Second Sino-Japanese War broke out. The Soviet Union signed the Sino-Soviet Non-Aggression Pact on 21 August 1937, and as part of this agreement, supplied large amounts of military equipment to the Chinese Nationalists, as well as deploying complete air force units, nominally manned by Soviet volunteers. An initial delivery of 62 SBs was made in September–October 1937, with combat operations by Soviet forces starting in December with attacks on Japanese ships on the Yangtze River. On 23 February 1938, to celebrate Soviet Army Day, Soviet SBs carried out a long range attack on Japanese airfields on Taiwan, claiming 40 Japanese aircraft destroyed on the ground.

A further 60 SBs were delivered to China in early 1938, these being heavily used to attack Japanese forces during the Battle of Wuhan. Losses were heavy, forcing the Chinese SB units to be temporarily withdrawn from combat. The Soviet units operating the SB over China re-equipped with the Ilyushin DB-3 in 1939, allowing their SBs to be transferred to Chinese units, but the Chinese made limited use of these reinforcements.

The Soviet Union supplied a further 100 SBs in 1941, just before it signed the Soviet–Japanese Neutrality Pact. The SB was gradually phased out of front-line operations against the Japanese with the delivery of more modern American bombers from 1942, being partly replaced by Lockheed Hudsons and B-25 Mitchells. Limited numbers of SBs continued in non-combat use, including operations against opium plantations, before being used against the Communists when the Chinese Civil War flared up in 1945, being finally withdrawn in 1946.

=== Mongolia ===
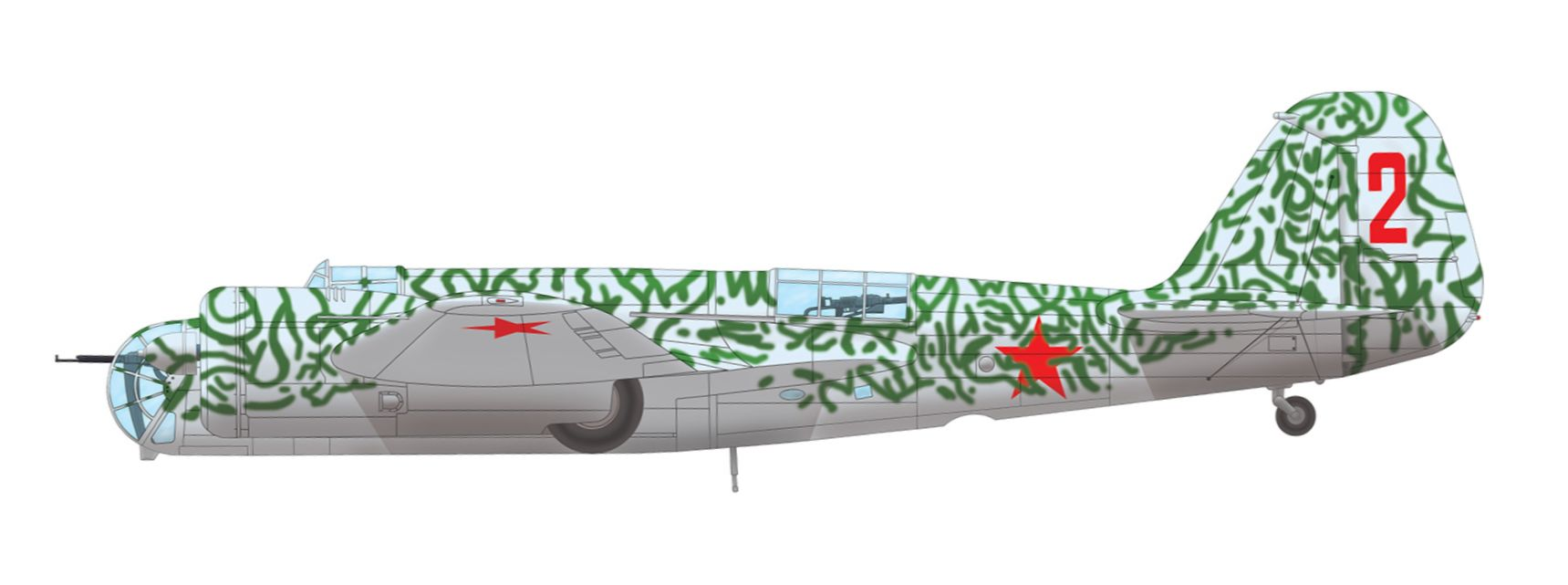
Tupolev SB 2M-103 of the 38th SBAP, Summer 1939

As well as the aircraft operated by volunteers against the Japanese over China, SBs were used in combat against the Japanese during the Battle of Lake Khasan on the eastern sector of the China–Russia border in July–August 1938, one SB being lost. Fighting between Soviet and Japanese forces broke out again at the Battles of Khalkhin Gol in Eastern Mongolia in May 1939. While SBs were not involved in the May air battles, where the Soviet forces suffered many losses, two Regiments of SBs were deployed to Mongolia in June, flying their first missions on 26 June. SBs were used against Japanese forces when they attacked in early July. The Soviet SB regiments consisted of a mixture of early and later SBs, whose differing speeds caused problems in maintaining formation, while Japanese Nakajima Ki-27 fighters proved adept in exploiting the poor defensive armament of the SB, with the radio operator operating both the dorsal and ventral guns. The Soviets changed tactics, flying SB missions at over 6,100 m (20,000 ft) where it was difficult for the Japanese to intercept. SBs continued to be used against the Japanese as the Soviets and Mongolian forces commanded by Georgy Zhukov carried out a successful offensive until a cease-fire was signed in September 1939.

=== Winter War ===
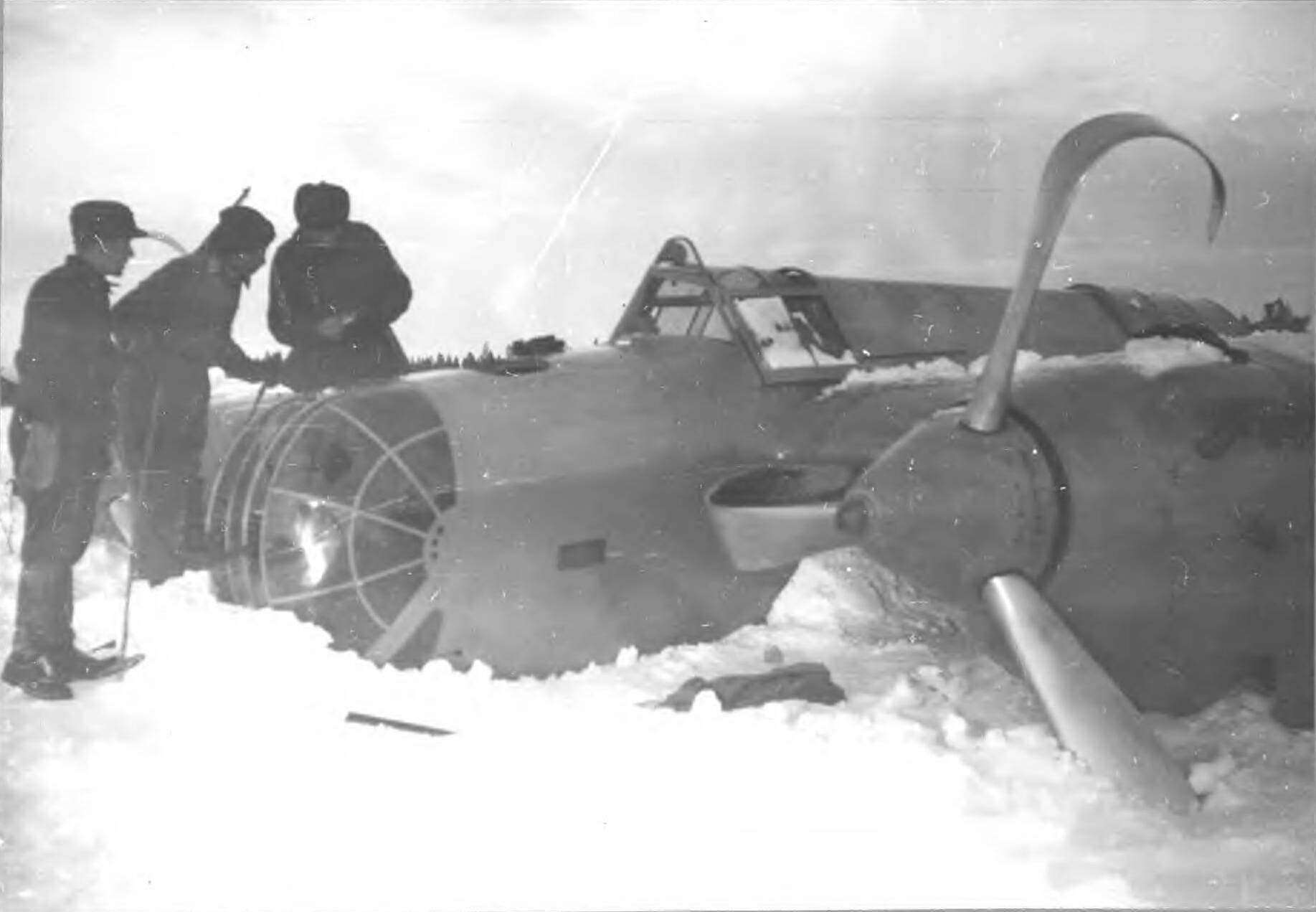
Swedish volunteers in the Winter War inspect a downed Tupolev SB.

On 30 November 1939, the Soviet Union attacked Finland in the conflict that became known as the Winter War, with the forces deployed against Finland including several hundred SBs. Losses were heavy, with bomber formations often un-escorted, and forced to operate at low level, where they were vulnerable to Finnish anti-aircraft fire and fighters. While in 1936 in Spain, the SB could outpace enemy fighters, by now it was vulnerable and poorly armed. SBs were fitted with skis for operation from snow covered airfields, slowing the aircraft and making them more vulnerable, while the need to wear heavy winter clothing made the gunner's job even harder. By the end of the 15-week war, at least 100 SBs had been lost, with the Finns claiming nearly 200 shot down, 92 of them to Finnish fighters.

=== Eastern Front ===
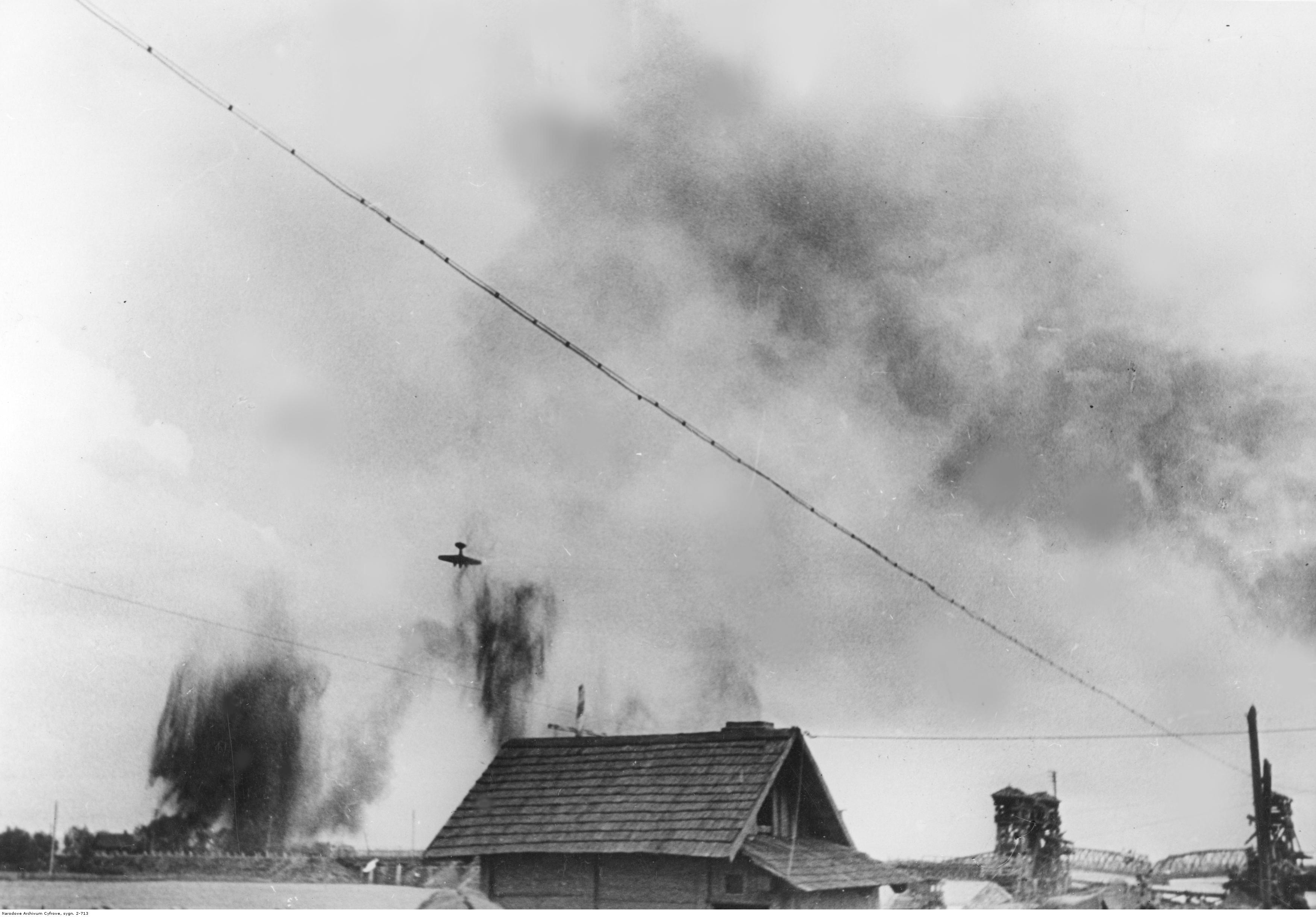
SB shot down near the Berezina river, July 1941

When Germany invaded the Soviet Union in June 1941, re-equipment with more modern aircraft such as the Pe-2 had begun. Still, 94% of the Soviet operational bomber force was equipped with SBs, with 1,500–2,000 SBs deployed along the Western border districts of the Soviet Union. The Luftwaffe started Operation Barbarossa with co-ordinated strikes against 66 major Soviet airfields, destroying a large proportion of Soviet air strength on the ground or air on the first day of the invasion. The SBs that survived the carnage of the first day continued to be poorly used, many being frittered away in unescorted low-level attacks against German tanks, where the SB's relatively large size and lack of armour made it highly vulnerable to German light Flak, while German fighters continued to take a heavy toll. Within a few days, losses forced most of the remaining SBs to switch to night attacks.

SBs continued to be used, in the defense of Leningrad and Moscow, mainly at night by attacking German artillery. By December 1941 almost all of the SBs had either been replaced or lost, although it remained in large-scale use until March 1942 in the North against Finland. SBs continued in use for non-combat roles such as supply dropping, glider towing and training, and continued in use in the Far East until 1945.

=== Finnish use ===
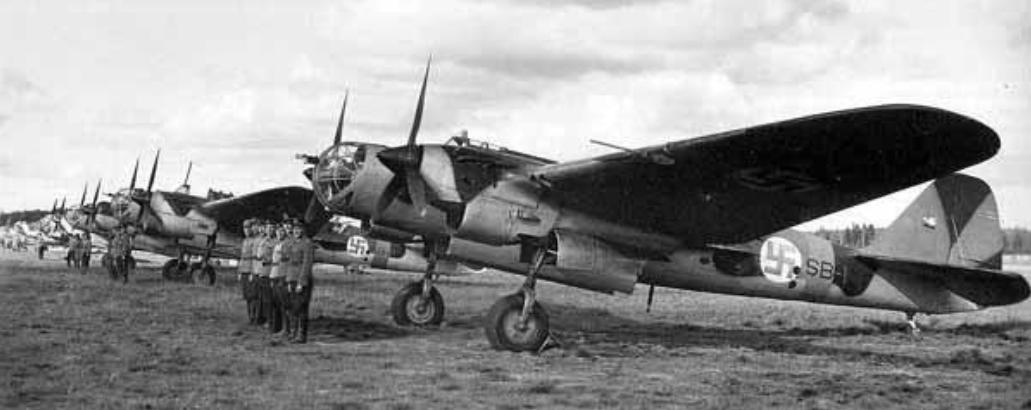
Tupolev SBs of the Finnish Air Force lined up.

Many Soviet SBs crashed or force-landed on Finnish soil during the Winter War, with the Finns salvaging as many aircraft as possible, with those in the best condition being sent to Valtion lentokonetehdas for possible repair for use by the Finnish air force. By the time of the Continuation War against the Soviet Union, five SBs had been repaired (with a further three added later), being used to equip Lentolaivue 6, flying maritime patrol and attack missions. These aircraft were supplemented by a further 16 SBs purchased from Germany, which had captured them during the initial weeks of the invasion of the Soviet Union. These SBs employed the first air-dropped depth charges used in combat. Finland lost seven SBs to accidents during the Continuation War, with none being lost in combat, with Finnish SBs claiming three Soviet submarines and a 4,000 ton merchant ship sunk.

== Variants ==
- ANT-35 – Airliner version. Also designated PS-35.
- ANT-38 – Unbuilt 1934 proposal for high speed bomber – possibly related to ANT-41.
- ANT-40 RTs (Rayt Tsiklon) or SB: first prototype with 545 kW (730 hp) Wright-Cyclone engines and with 19.0 m (62 ft 4 in) wingspan. It was completed in September 1934, making its first flight on 7 October 1934. It was damaged in a forced landing and rebuilt with 670 kW (900 hp) Tumansky M-87 engines, and a second set of test flights were made from 5 February to 31 July 1935. Development not continued as ANT-40 IS was superior. Used as experimental (ski gears, etc.) model.
- ANT-40 IS (Hispano-Suiza): Prototypes powered by 560 kW (750 hp) Hispano-Suiza 12Y engines, and with longer span (20.3 m (66 ft 7 1/4 in) wings. Two built, with the first ANT-40_{1} flying on 30 December 1934, reaching 378 km/h (235 mph) during initial tests and 402 km/h (250 mph) during later flights. Second example, ANT-40_{2}, with modified wings and tail emerged in September 1935 and served as a production prototype.
- ANT-41 – unrelated Torpedo bomber with similar layout to SB but larger and more powerful. One built in 1936, abandoned after destroyed in crash due to severe flutter.
- ANT-46 – two-seat heavy fighter, similar to ANT-40_{1}, but powered by two imported 597 kW (800 hp) Gnome-Rhône 14K engines and armed with two 100 mm recoilless rifles in outer wings, four fixed machine guns in the nose, and one flexibly mounted machine gun in the observers cockpit. One prototype, with Air Force designation DI-8 first flown in August 1935, but abandoned after abandonment of Leonid Kurchevsky's recoilless rifle projects and his subsequent arrest.
- ANT-48 – high-speed sport aircraft project.
- ANT-49 – proposed long-range reconnaissance variant with aerial cameras in the bomb bay and larger fuel tanks; project cancelled before a prototype was built.
- SB 2M-100 – first production model. Wing area increased to 56.7 m^{2} (610 ft^{2}). Equipped with Klimov M-100 engines (the Hispano-Suiza 12Y built under licence) driving two-bladed propellers.
- SB 2M-100A – new M-100A engines of 642 kW (860 hp), driving three-bladed propellers. Produced from late 1936. Sometimes unofficially referred to as the SBbis.
- SB 2M-100A modernizirovannyi – new rear gun installation with MV-3 dorsal turret. Tested in May 1937. Accepted, but no production.
- SB-bis – prototype powered by 716 kW (960 hp) Klimov M-103 engines, dual controls and variable-pitch propellers. It flew in September 1937, but increased weight lead to reduced performance.
- SB-bis2 – M-103 powered prototype with polished wings. Little increase in performance. No production.
- SB-bis3 – third M-103 powered prototype, with new engine nacelles with radiators relocated under engines rather than the frontal radiators fitted in earlier aircraft. Tested from 1 November 1937 – 17 January 1938, with testing showing maximum speed increasing to 446 km/h (277 mph). Improvements later incorporated into production aircraft.
- SB 2M-103 — 10th series. 1938 production version with M-103 engines fitted with original frontal radiators and strengthened structure. Fitted with emergency flight controls for navigator, provision for retractable skis, and for two 368 litre external fuel tanks.
- SB 2M-103 – 14th series. Late 1939 production, with M-103 engine and revised nacelles and radiators as tested in SBbis3.
- SB 2M-103 – 18th series. Further improved production version, with fixed radiator intakes and partially polished wings. VISh-22 three-bladed variable-pitch propellers. Fitted with MV-3 dorsal turret.
- SB 2M-104 — Approximately 30–50 aircraft were completed with M-104 engines, but engine not in series production.
- SB 2M-106 — A few aircraft completed with M-106 engines, but engine not in production.
- USB – dual control trainer, with the instructor sitting in an open cockpit in the nose replacing the navigator. Over 120 built, powered by the M-100A or M-103.
- SB-MN (Men'she nesushchye – reduced area) or MMN (Modifikatsiya men'she nesushchye) — second generation level bomber powered by 783 kW (1,050 hp) M-105 engines and with new wings with NACA 22 high lift airfoils, reduced wing area and span (18.0 m (59 ft 0 3/4 in). One built.
- SB-RK (Razreznoye krilo – slotted wing) – Dive bomber developed in parallel with SB-MN. Same wings as SB-MN, but with large slotted flaps usable as dive brakes. The cooling radiators were buried within the wings, with an air intake on the leading and the exhaust on the wing's upper surface. Equipped with three ShKAS machine guns, and it could carry six 100 kg (220 lb) bombs or two 250 kg (550 lb) bombs internally or 1,500 kg (3,300 lb) bombs externally. Ordered into production as Arkhangelskii Ar-2. 200 built before it was superseded by the Pe-2 and Tu-2.
- SBB-1 — Archangelskii's last iteration of the SB, based on SB-MN and -RK, with even smaller wings (16.0 m (52 ft 5 7/8 in) span) twin tail and other changes. Alternative designation B. One prototype flown 1940 but no production.
- Avia B-71 – SB 2M-100A licence built in Czechoslovakia.
- PS-40 – cargo version for Aeroflot, powered by M-100A engines and with all military equipment removed. Capable of carrying cargo or six passengers. 100 supplied during 1938.
- PS-41 – Conversion of SB 2M-103 as freighter for Aeroflot. PS-41bis fitted with underwing fuel tanks.
- Pterodactyl – SB 2M-103 fitted with fixed tricycle landing gear. One converted 1940.

== Operators ==
Bulgaria

- Bulgarian Air Force operated 32 Avia B-71 aircraft redesignated Avia-Katiusza Ě-8.

China

- Chinese Nationalist Air Force received 62 SB 2M-100 bombers in the autumn 1937. The Soviet Union delivered 3 more SB 2M-100 and SB 2M-105 bombers from August 1938 – June 1941.

China-Nanjing

- The Reorganized Republic of China Air Force had two Tupolev bombers that had been flown by defected Nationalist pilots.

Czechoslovakia

- Czechoslovak Air Force received 60 Russian-built SB with Hispano Suiza 12Ybrs engines in April and May 1938. Another 101 bombers and 60 reconnaissance aircraft were ordered to be built under license as the Avia B-71 but only 101 were built.

Finland

- Finnish Air Force operated 24 SB bombers. The first eight aircraft (seven powered by M-103 engines, one by M-100 engines) were captured during the Winter War, another 16 aircraft were converted from German-captured material from 5 November 1941 – 27 August 1942. All aircraft were refitted with M-103 engines and were used as anti-submarine aircraft in the LeLv 6 squadron. Two aircraft were rebuilt and were used as trainers. The Finnish Air Force withdrew all SB aircraft in 1945, and all were scrapped in 1950.

Germany

- Luftwaffe operated captured aircraft, including Czech-built Avia B-71 and Soviet SB.

Poland

- Polish Air Force operated few USB 2M-103 aircraft for training after World War II.

Slovak Republic (1939 - 1945)

- Slovak Air Force operated one Avia B-71 aircraft until April 18, 1943, when čtk Anton Vanko and four other airmen defected with it to Turkey.

Soviet Union

- Soviet Air Force
- Aeroflot received an unknown number of retired military SB 2M-100 aircraft in 1938 and after rebuild, used them under the designation PS-40. Another batch of retired SBbis 3 bombers was rebuilt in 1940 and used under the designation PS-41.

Spanish Republic

- Republican Spanish Air Force received its first 31 SB 2M-100A bombers on 14 October 1936. The second batch of 31 aircraft was delivered in June–July 1937 and a final batch of 31 following in 1938. The Soviet Union delivered a total of 93 SBs to Spain.

Spanish State

- Nationalist Spanish Air Force captured 19 SB 2M-100A bombers. All were overhauled and Soviet M-100 engines were replaced with French Hispano Suiza 12Ybrs. These aircraft were used operationally and later for training duties, and were retired in 1950. Spanish pilots called captured SB bombers Katiuska.

== Aircraft on display ==
After Stalin's post-war cleanup in the 1950s, many ANT-40s that survived the Second World War were scrapped. In the late 1970s, however, Vozdushni Transport (A Soviet aviation newspaper) sent an expedition led by Evgeny Konoplev to survey an ANT-40 that was forced to land during a snow storm near the Yuzhne Muiski mountain range in the Baikal region. Konoplev considered what they found encouraging, with the aircraft being in fairly decent condition, in turn leading a team of VVS pilots to recover the airplane. It was returned to Moscow and restored by a group of volunteer Tupolev employees. The restored aircraft was unveiled in April 1982 at the Central Air Force Museum at Monino Airfield. Another ANT-40 is displayed in Verhnyaya Pyshma.

A reproduction of an SB is under construction by the La Senia Airfield Association in La Sénia, Catalonia.

== Specifications (SB 2M-103) ==
Tupoljev ANT-40 3-view drawing

Data from SB:The Radical Tupolev

General characteristics

- Crew: 3
- Length: 12.57 m (41 ft 3 in)
- Wingspan: 20.33 m (66 ft 8 in)
- Height: 3.6 m (11 ft 10 in)
- Wing area: 56.7 m^{2} (610 sq ft)
- Airfoil:
  root: TsAGI-6 mod. (16%);
  tip: TsAGI-6 mod (12.5%)
- Empty weight: 4,768 kg (10,512 lb)
- Gross weight: 6,308 kg (13,907 lb)
- Max takeoff weight: 7,880 kg (17,372 lb)
- Powerplant: 2 × Klimov M-103 V-12 liquid-cooled piston engines, 716 kW (960 hp) each
- Propellers: 3-bladed variable-pitch propellers

Performance

- Maximum speed: 450 km/h (280 mph, 240 kn) at 4,100 m (13,500 ft)
- Range: 2,300 km (1,400 mi, 1,200 nmi)
- Service ceiling: 9,300 m (30,500 ft)
- Time to altitude:
  - 1,000 m (3,300 ft) in 1 minute 48 seconds
  - 9,000 m (30,000 ft) in 32 minutes

Armament

- Guns: 4 × 7.62 mm ShKAS machine guns (two in nose, one in dorsal and one in ventral position)
- Bombs: 6 × 100 kg (220 lb) or six 50 kg (110 lb) bombs in bomb-bay, 2 × 250 kg (550 lb) bombs on wing racks

== See also ==
Related development

- Tupolev ANT-41
- Arkhangelsky Ar-2

Aircraft of comparable role, configuration, and era

- Bristol Blenheim
- Kawasaki Ki-48
- Martin Maryland
- Mitsubishi G3M

Related lists

- List of aircraft of World War II
- List of aircraft of the Spanish Republican Air Force

== Bibliography ==
- Beevor, Antony. Stalingrad. London:Penguin Books, 1999. ISBN 0-14-024985-0.
- Duffy, Paul and Andrei Kandalov. Tupolev: The Man and His Aircraft. Shrewsbury, UK:Airlife, 1996. ISBN 1-85310-728-X.
- Gunston, Bill. The Osprey Encyclopedia of Russian Aircraft 1875–1995. London:Osprey, 1995. ISBN 1-85532-405-9.
- Kulikov, Victor and Michulec, Robert.Tupolew SB, Monografie Lotnicze 83. Gdańsk, AJ-Press, 2002. ISBN 83-7237-113-X (Polish publication).
- Jackson, Robert. Aircraft of world war II – Development – Weaponry – Specifications. London, Amber Books, 2003. ISBN 978-1-85605-751-6.
- Lawrence, Joseph (1945). The Observer's Book Of Airplanes. London and New York: Frederick Warne & Co.
- Martinez, Luis Garcia. "Los Katiuskas". Air Enthusiast, Thirty-two, December 1986 – April 1987. Bromley, UK: Pilot Press, 1987. ISSN 0143-5450. pp. 45–55.
- Maslov, Mikhail. "Database: The Tupolev SB Bombers". Aeroplane, January 2007, Vol 35 no. 1. pp. 62–87.
- MPM (Modely Plastikvym Modelarum) manual to SB 2M-100 model kit
- "SB: The Radical Tupolev". Air International, January 1989. Vol 36 No 1. pp. 44–51. Bromley, UK:Fine Scroll. ISSN 0306-5634.
- "SB: The Radical Tupolev Part Two". Air International, February 1989. Vol 36 No 2. pp. 77–89, 100–102. Bromley, UK:Fine Scroll. ISSN 0306-5634.
- "SB: The Radical Tupolev Part Three". Air International, March 1989. Vol 36 No 3. pp. 148–155. Bromley, UK:Fine Scroll. ISSN 0306-5634.
- Stenman, Kari. "The Anti-Soviet Tupolevs: Finland's Russian Bombers". Air Enthusiast, Twenty-seven, March–June 1985. pp. 9–20. Bromley, UK: Fine Scroll. ISSN 0143-5450.
- Walg, A.J. "Wings Over the Steppes: Aerial Warfare in Mongolia 1930–45: Part Two". Air Enthusiast, No 67, January/February 1997. pp. 2–5. Stamford, UK:Key Publishing. ISSN 0143-5450.
- https://web.archive.org/web/20110605015707/http://www.aviation.ru/Tu/#ANT-40
