= Mathematical Society of the Republic of Moldova =

- Societatea Matematică din Republica Moldova
- Headquarters: Chişinău
- Location: Moldova

The Mathematical Society of the Republic of Moldova is (Romanian: Societatea Matematică din Republica Moldova) is a non-governmental organisation promoting interests of mathematicians.

== Notable people ==
- Petru Soltan
