= Aleksei Arkhangelsky =

Russian footballer

Personal information
- Full name: Aleksei Leonidovich Arkhangelsky
- Date of birth: 9 September 1986 (age 40)
- Height: 1.82 m (5 ft 11 1/2 in)
- Position: Goalkeeper

Senior career*
Years	Team	Apps	(Gls)
2005	Nara-Desna Naro-Fominsk	0	(0)
2006	Darida Minsk Raion	2	(0)
2006	Zelenograd	13	(0)
2007–2009	Dmitrov	79	(0)
2010	Volochanin-Ratmir Vyshny Volochyok	13	(0)
2011	Sever Murmansk	14	(0)
2012	Volochanin-Ratmir Vyshny Volochyok	10	(0)
- * Club domestic league appearances and goals

Aleksei Leonidovich Arkhangelsky (Russian: Алексей Леонидович Архангельский; born 9 September 1986) is a retired Russian professional football player.
