= Lebedenco =

- Commune
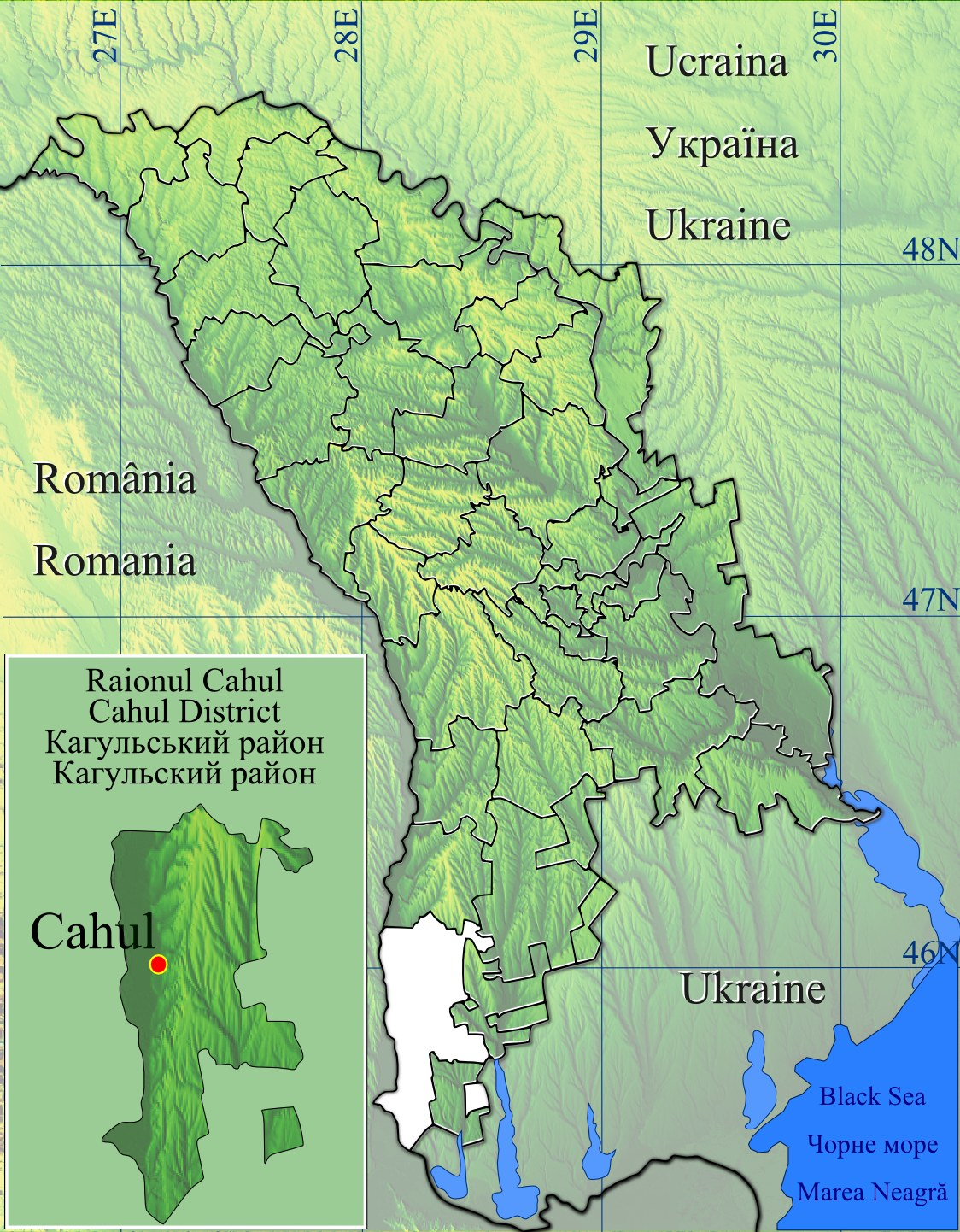
- Location within Cahul
- Coordinates: 45°51′46″N 28°17′17″E
- Country: Moldova
- District: Cahul

Population (2014)
  - Total: 2,171
- Time zone: UTC+2 (EET)
  - Summer (DST): UTC+3 (EEST)
- Postal code: MD-3922

Lebedenco is a commune in Cahul District, Moldova. It is composed of three villages: Hutulu, Lebedenco and Ursoaia.
