= Arkhangelsky Ar-2 =

Soviet dive bomber aircraft

Ar-2
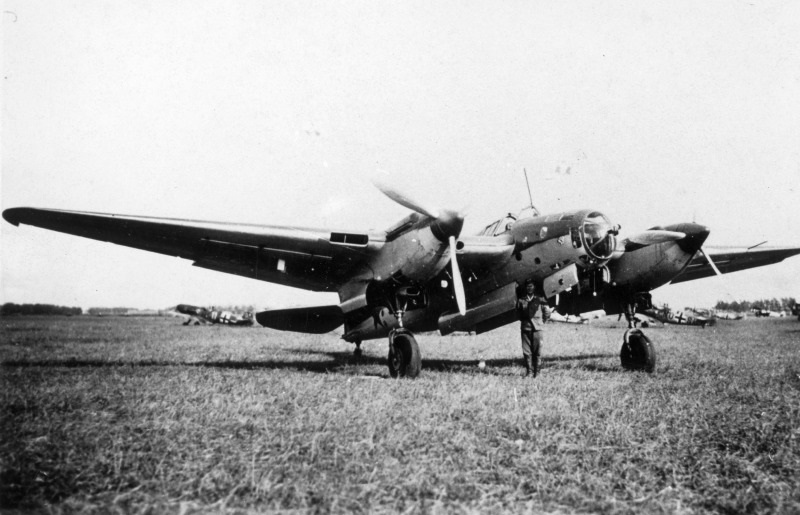

General information
- Type: Dive bomber
- Manufacturer: Zavod 22
- Designer: Alexander Arkhangelsky
- Primary user: Soviet Air Force
- Number built: ca. 190

History
- Introduction date: 1940
- First flight: October 1940
- Developed from: Tupolev SB

The Arkhangelsky Ar-2 was a Soviet dive-bomber used in small numbers during World War II. Its design was a refinement of the earlier Soviet Tupolev SB.

The design bureau's name (Cyrillic: Архангельский) is transliterated in many ways in English sources, in a variety of combinations of Arch-, Arkh-, -sky, -ski, -skii, -skij).

== Development ==
Alexander Arkhangelsky was already second in command at the Tupolev OKB when Andrei Tupolev was imprisoned in one of Stalin's purges. During Tupolev's absence, Arkhangelsky was authorised to append his name to the SB variants that were in the pipeline when he took over.

The Ar-2 represented a final attempt to extend the useful lifespan of the SB design which had first flown in 1934. In early 1940, Arkhangelsky had worked on a refined SB, designated MMN, but this had proved disappointing, with performance no better than the original SB. The Ar-2 was therefore a greater departure from the Tupolev design, in the hopes of creating an aircraft that could attain a speed of 600 km/h (374 mph) at 6,500 m (21,300 ft), and incorporate the newly developed PB-3 bombsight to give dive-bombing capability.

The major airframe changes made on the Ar-2 were streamlining of the engine nacelles (which now housed engines with around 15% greater power), completely new outer wing panels of greater span and taper, and a new, glazed nose. The engine cooling system was moved inside the wings, with air inlets on the leading edges and exits on the underwings. Dive brakes were added to allow for the type's new role. Initially designated SB-RK, factory testing of two prototypes commenced in October 1940, and the following month, an example was delivered to the Soviet NII-VVS (Air Force Scientific Test Institute) for evaluation. In December, the NKAP redesignated the aircraft to incorporate Arkhangelsky's name.

The results of the NII-VVS tests were encouraging. While the hoped-for top speed was not attained, the aircraft's handling was an improvement on the SB, and the dive-bombing adaptations worked very well. Weaknesses identified included major problems with engine cooling and lubrication and deficiencies in defensive armament (the latter a common problem with Soviet bombers of the period). The report concluded that the aircraft should be put into production and development continued to eliminate the remaining defects.

Production started in late 1940, but already the machine had been superseded by the Petlyakov Pe-2 and the flight of the Tupolev Tu-2 prototype. Therefore, after only 190 Ar-2s had been constructed, Zavod 22 (the aircraft factory previously devoted to Ar-2 manufacture) was turned over to Pe-2 manufacture in early 1941.

Arkhangelsky OKB continued its attempts to refine the SB, creating a final development, the SBB in 1941. All further work in this direction was terminated at the outbreak of war with Germany and Alexander Arkhangelsky was reassigned to Zavod 156 to oversee maintenance and repair of operational SB aircraft.

== Operational history ==
Beginning in 1940, Ar-2s were assigned to units already operating the SB, and the two types were operated side by side. At least half of all Ar-2s built were destroyed during the German offensive of 1941, with a small number still operating until about 1943.

== Operators ==
Soviet Union

- Soviet Air Force
- Soviet Naval Aviation

== Units using this aircraft ==
=== Soviet Air Force ===
- 2SBAP of 2SAD
- 46SBAP of 7SAD
- 54SBAP of 54SAD
- 13SBAP of 9SAD
- 33BAP of 19BAD
- 27IAP (fighter unit, used Ar-2 for dive-bombing training)

=== Soviet Navy ===
- 73BAP of 10SAD, Baltic Fleet

== Specifications ==
Arkhangelsky Ar-2 3-view drawing

General characteristics

- Crew: three
- Length: 12.50 m (41 ft 0 in)
- Wingspan: 18.00 m (59 ft 0 in)
- Height: 3.56 m (11 ft 8 in)
- Wing area: 48.2 m^{2} (519 sq ft)
- Empty weight: 4,516 kg (9,956 lb)
- Gross weight: 8,150 kg (17,970 lb)
- Powerplant: 2 × Klimov M-105R piston engine , 820 kW (1,100 hp) each

Performance

- Maximum speed: 512 km/h (319 mph, 277 kn)
- Range: 1,500 km (940 mi, 820 nmi)
- Service ceiling: 10,500 m (34,400 ft)
- Rate of climb: 12.8 m/s (2,510 ft/min)

Armament

- 3 × 7.62 mm ShKAS machine guns
- 1,600 kg (3,530 lb) bombs

== See also ==
Related development

- Tupolev SB

Aircraft of comparable role, configuration, and era

- Amiot 354
- de Havilland Mosquito
- Dornier Do 215
- Douglas DB-7
- Kawasaki Ki-48
- Petlyakov Pe-2
- SNCAC NC.150
- Tupolev Tu-2

Related lists

- List of aircraft of World War II
- List of bomber aircraft
- List of military aircraft of the Soviet Union and the CIS
