= D. Reidel =

Dutch academic publishing company

- Status: Defunct
- Successor: Kluwer Academic
- Country of origin: Netherlands
- Headquarters location: Dordrecht
- Publication types: Academic journals

D. Reidel was an academic publishing company based in Dordrecht established in the 1960s.

== History ==
Reidel was established in the 1960s, with a focus on publishing research in physics. David Reidel himself had been trained under an ex-Elsevier manager, M. D. Frank, who considered third-generation Dutch publishers like Reidel to be the "grandchildren" of the German publishing company, Akademische Verlagsgesellschaft of Leipzig, where Frank himself was trained. "In the 1960s a mainly physics programme was established by D. Reidel Publishing Company in Dordrecht. Other players included Dr. W. Junk, P. Noordhoff and M. Nijhoff, who were all to become part of a group that began in the 1970s and which resulted in the establishment of Kluwer Academic Publishers. Publishers like Reidel, trained by Frank – who in turn had had his training at Aka – were termed by Frank 'grandchildren of Aka.'"

In the 1990s Reidel joined with Kluwer as Kluwer/Reidel, in 2003 being purchased by Cinven and Candover. In spring 2004, Cinven and Candover purchased Springer, merging the operations of all the publishers into one conglomerate, Springer Science+Business Media, now "the second largest commercial scholarly publisher in the world" after Elsevier.

Aka had been co-founded by Walter Jalowicz (who changed his name to Johnson and later worked for Academic Press in New York) and his son-in-law K. Jacoby, together with the physicist (and spy) Paul Rosbaud (later of Butterworth), and chemist E. Proskauer (later vice-president of John Wiley & Sons).
