= Topology and Its Applications =

- Discipline: Topology
- Language: English
- Edited by: A.S. Dow and J. van Mill

Publication details
- Former names: General Topology and Its Applications
- History: 1971–present
- Publisher: Elsevier
- Frequency: 18/year
- Impact factor: 0.617 (2020)

Standard abbreviations
- ISO 4: Topol. Its Appl.
- MathSciNet: Topology Appl.

Indexing
- Topology and Its Applications
- CODEN: TIAPD9
- ISSN: 0166-8641 (print); 1879-3207 (web)
- LCCN: 80649265
- OCLC no.: 5843055
- General Topology and Its Applications
- CODEN: GTPYAB
- ISSN: 0016-660X
- LCCN: sn82021705
- OCLC no.: 898001293

Links
- Journal homepage; Online access (Topol. Its Appl.); Online archive (Gen. Topol. Its Appl.)

Topology and Its Applications is a peer-reviewed mathematics journal publishing research on topology. It was established in 1971 as General Topology and Its Applications, and renamed to its current title in 1980. The journal currently publishes 18 issues each year in one volume. It is indexed by Scopus, Mathematical Reviews, and Zentralblatt MATH. Its 2004–2008 MCQ was 0.38 and its 2020 impact factor was 0.617.
