= Arkhanhelske, Donetsk Oblast =

Village in Ukraine

Arkhanhelske Архангельське
- Village
- Interactive map of Arkhanhelske
- Location of Arkhanhelske Arkhanhelske (Ukraine)
- Coordinates: 48°16′0″N 37°38′40″E
- Country: Ukraine
- Oblast: Donetsk Oblast
- Raion: Pokrovsk Raion
- Hromada: Ocheretyne settlement hromada
- Elevation: 177 m (581 ft)

Population (2001)
  - Total: 285
- Time zone: UTC+2 (EET)
  - Summer (DST): UTC+3 (EEST)
- Postal code: 86020
- Area code: +380 6236

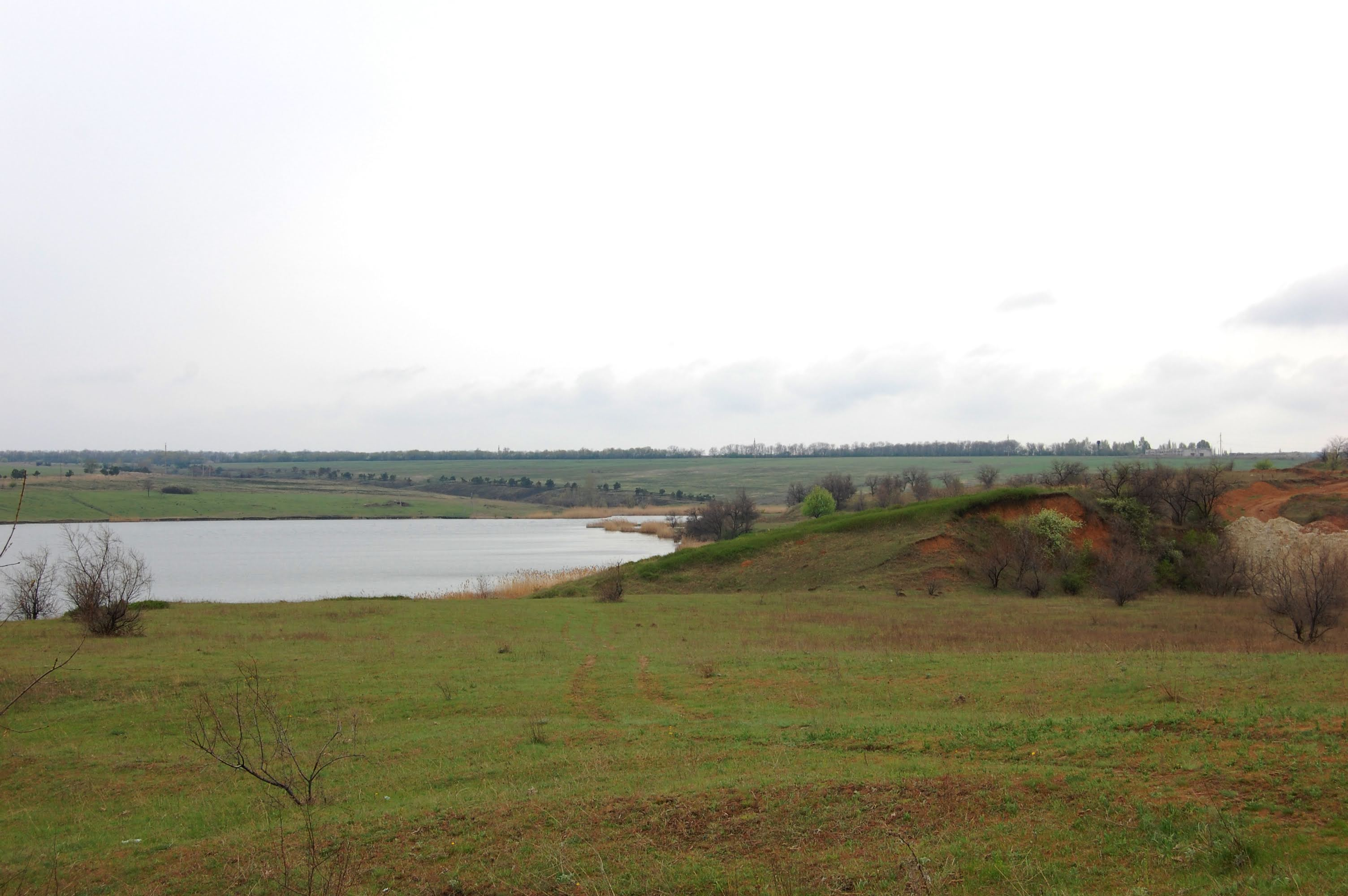
Pond near the village, formed by a local dam

Arkhanhelske (Ukrainian: Архангельське; Russian: Архангельское) is a village in Ocheretyne settlement hromada, Pokrovsk Raion, Donetsk Oblast, eastern Ukraine. As of 2001, the population was 285 people.

== History ==
Russia claimed to have taken control over the village during its invasion of Ukraine on 25 May 2024. The occupation was confirmed by DeepStateMap.Live.

== Geography ==
The distance from Arkhanhelske to the district centre is approximately 29 km.

== Notable people ==
Literary critic Dmytro Vasylovych Chaliy was born here.

== Demographics ==
According to 2001 census data, the population of the village was 285, with 49.12% indicating Ukrainian as their native language, and 50.88% indicating Russian.
