= Tsar Tank =

Experimental Russian armoured vehicle

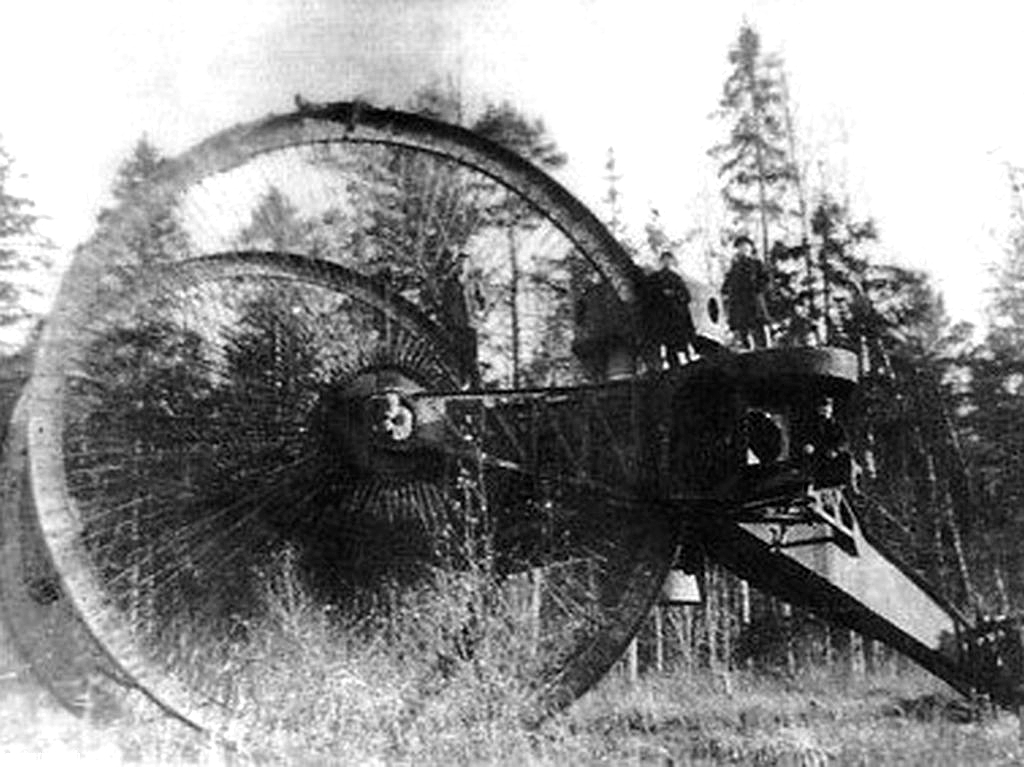
- The Tsar Tank
- Place of origin: Russian Empire

Service history
- In service: 1914–1915 (experimental)
- Used by: Russian Empire

Production history
- Designed: 1914
- No. built: 1

Specifications
- Mass: approx 60 t (59 long tons; 66 short tons)
- Length: 18 m (59 ft)
- Width: 12 metres (39 ft)
- Height: 9 m (30 ft)
- Crew: 10
- Main armament: cannon and machine guns (turret and sponsons)
- Engine: 2x Maybach engine 240 hp (180 kW) each

An image of the side of the Tsar Tank.

The Tsar Tank (Russian: Царь-танк), also known as the Netopyr' (Russian: Нетопырь, literally "pipistrelle") or Lebedenko Tank (Russian: танк Лебеденко), was a Russian armoured vehicle developed by Nikolai Lebedenko, Nikolay Yegorovich Zhukovsky, Boris Stechkin, and Alexander Mikulin from 1914 onwards. The project was cancelled in 1915 after initial tests deemed the vehicle to be underpowered and vulnerable to artillery fire.

== History ==
The Lebedenko Tank differed from modern tanks in that it did not use caterpillar tracks—rather, it used a tricycle design. The two front spoked wheels were nearly 9 metres (30 ft) in diameter, and the rear-mounted third wheel was only 1.5 metres (5 ft) high. According to the memoirs of Lebedenko, the idea of this machine was prompted by Central Asian araba carts, which, thanks to large diameter wheels, were able to easily traverse bumps and ditches. The upper cannon turret reached a height of nearly 8 metres (26 ft). The hull was 12 metres (39 ft) wide with two more cannon in sponsons. Additional weapons were also planned under the belly. Each wheel was powered by a 240 horsepower (180 kW) Maybach engine. Each engine drove a car wheel which transferred power to a matching giant wheel by being pressed against its rim. The design had a top speed of 10 miles per hour (16 km/h).

Lebedenko had a private laboratory in Moscow (Sadovo-Kudrinskaya, 23) where he carried out orders from the military. The decisive audience for the project took place in January 1915 during which Lebedenko presented Nicholas II with a clockwork wooden model of his car with an engine based on a gramophone spring. According to the recollections of the courtiers, the Tsar and the engineer played with a model of the machine which briskly ran along the carpet, easily overcoming stacks of two or three volumes of the "Code of Laws of the Russian Empire". Nicholas II, impressed by the vehicle, ordered 210,000 rubles to be allocated from his own funds for the project.

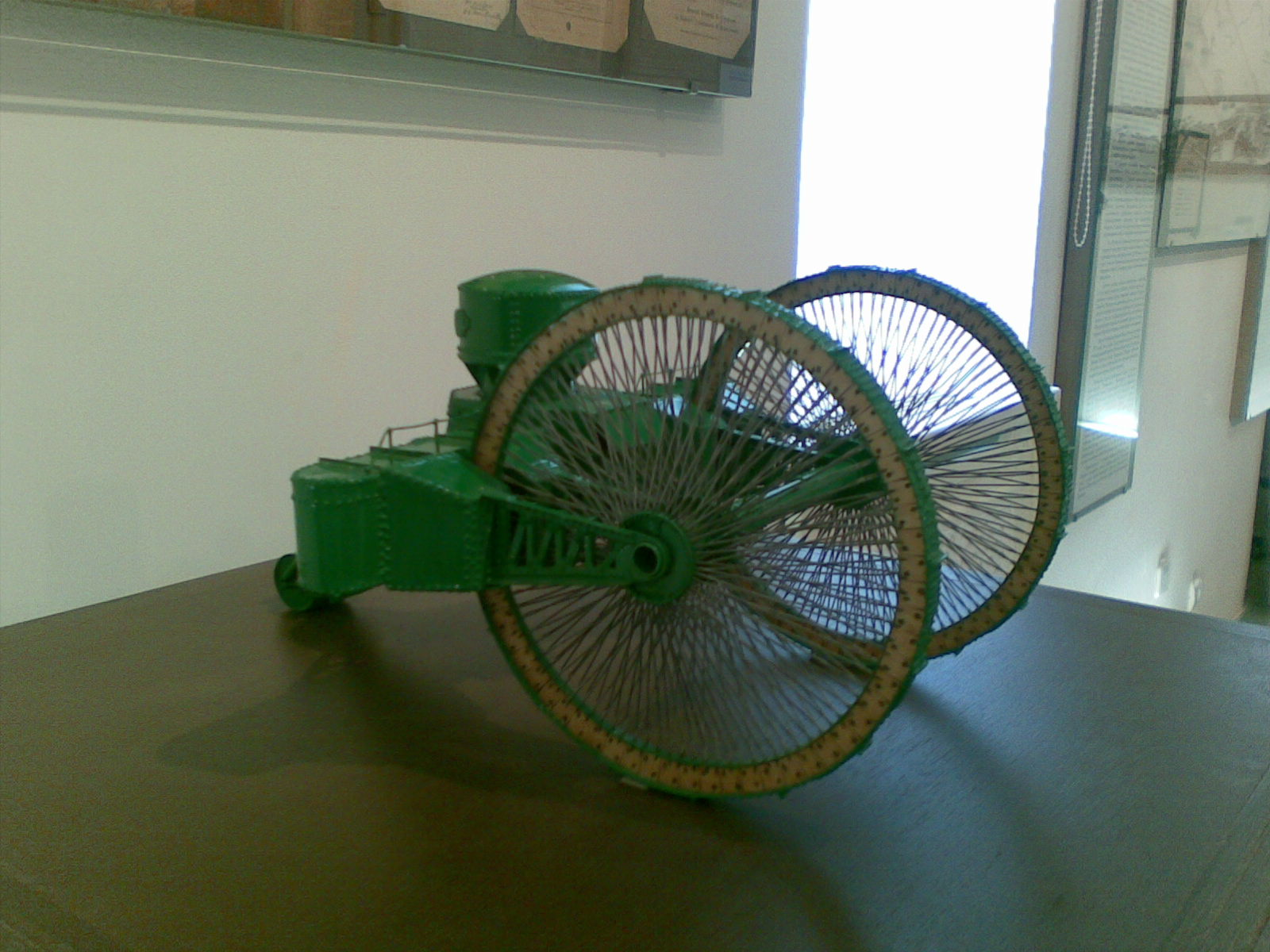
A modern model of the Tsar tank in a museum

Details of the tank were manufactured at a plant in Khamovniki District, Moscow. The huge wheels were intended to cross significant obstacles. However, the rear steerable roller, due to its small size and the incorrect weight distribution of the machine as a whole, got stuck in soft ground almost immediately after the start of the test. Despite being fitted with twin 240 hp Maybach engines, the large wheels were unable to pull it out. This led to a number of failed tests before the High Commission in August 1915, and in September the project was cancelled. Despite this, Stechkin and Mikulin began to develop a new engine (AMBES) for the vehicle. However, this attempt was unsuccessful, as were attempts to move the Tsar Tank from its place and pull it out of the test area. Until 1917, the tank was guarded at the test site, but then, due to the outbreak of the Russian Revolution, the vehicle was abandoned. Design work on it was no longer carried out and the huge structure of the vehicle rusted for another 6 years in the forest some 60 kilometres (37 mi) from Moscow until 1923, when the tank was finally dismantled for scrap.

== See also ==
- Vezdekhod
