= Nikolay Lebedenko =

Russian military engineer

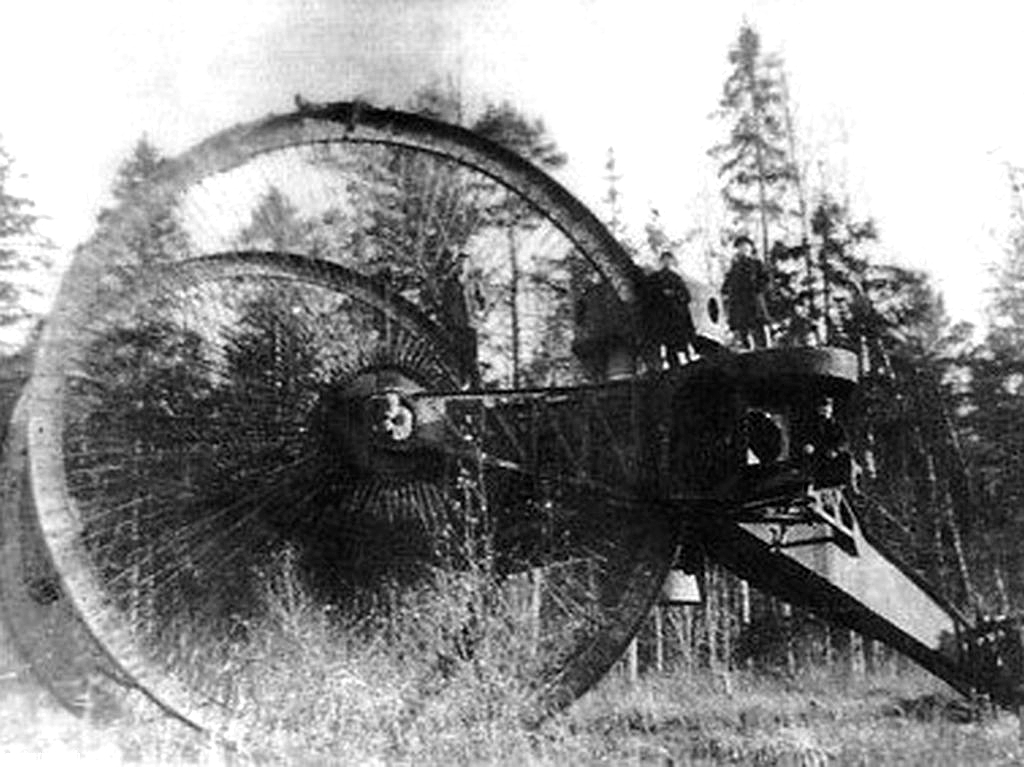
Lebedenko Tank, or the Tsar Tank

Nikolay Lebedenko (Russian: Никола́й Лебеде́нко) was a Russian military engineer, mostly known as the main developer of the Lebedenko Tank, or the Tsar Tank, which was the largest armored vehicle in history, constructed in 1916–1917. Lebedenko was employed in a private firm, that worked for the Russian War Department, designing artillery devices before and during World War I, as well as the bomb release mechanism for the Ilya Muromets bomber.

There is little known about the biography of Lebedenko or his year of birth and death. A page on the web resource of the Moscow City Museum states he was reportedly born on 2 March 1879 and died on 26 May 1948. During the war, he owned a private laboratory on Sadovaya-Kudrinskaya Street in Moscow, where he developed his projects for the Imperial Russian Army, including the Tsar Tank. His idea intrigued Nikolai Zhukovsky, a scientist he had met earlier in a scientific and medical conference before the war, and thus, development began. After he left Russia for the United States in the autumn of 1917, nothing is known about the fate of Lebedenko. It is quite possible, however, that Lebedenko died a quiet natural death, being about 70 years old in 1948.
