= Aleksandr Arkhangelsky =

Aleksandr Aleksandrovich Arkhangelsky (Russian: Алекса́ндр Алекса́ндрович Арха́нгельский, 1892 – 18 December 1978) was a Soviet and Russian aircraft designer and doctor of technical sciences. Hero of Socialist Labour (1947)

== Biography ==
Arkhangelsky was born in 1892, and graduated from MVTU in 1918. During his studies, he worked at the aerodynamic laboratory headed by Nikolay Zhukovsky, then worked at TsAGI from 1918 to 1936.

He designed and built several aerosleds ARBES along with B. S. Stechkin. After the establishment of the aircraft design bureau of Andrei Tupolev at TsAGI, he participated in all ANT designs.

In 1932, he was appointed chief of the department of high-speed aircraft. He was the leading designer of the first Soviet bomber, the ANT-40 (SB), and its transport development, the PS-35. From 1936 on, he was chief of the bureau and responsible for large-scale production of the SB. He was the chief designer of the Ar-2.

Arhangelsky OKB rejoined Tupolev OKB in 1941. In 1947, he became first deputy chief designer.

He was the uncle of mathematician Alexander Arhangelskii.

He died in 1978.
