= List of inventors =

This is a of people who are described as being inventors or are credited with an invention.

== Alphabetical list ==
=== A ===
- Vitaly Abalakov (1906–1986), Russia – camming devices, Abalakov thread (or V-thread), gearless ice climbing anchor
- Ernst Karl Abbe (1840–1905), Germany – Condenser (microscope), apochromatic lens, refractometer
- Hovannes Adamian (1879–1932), USSR/Russia/Armenia – tricolor principle of the color television
- Samuel W. Alderson (1914–2005), U.S. – crash test dummy
- Alexandre Alexeieff (1901–1982), Russia/France – Pinscreen animation (with his wife Claire Parker)
- Rostislav Alexeyev (1916–1980), Russia/USSR – Ekranoplan
- Randi Altschul (born 1960), U.S. – Disposable cellphone
- Abram Alikhanov (1904–1970), Armenia/USSR – Soviet atomic bomb, nuclear reactor
- Bruce Ames (1928–2024), U.S. – Ames test (Cell biology)
- Giovanni Battista Amici (1786–1863), Italy – Dipleidoscope, Amici prism
- Ruth Amos (born 1989), UK – StairSteady
- Mary Anderson (1866–1953), U.S. – windshield wiper blade
- Momofuku Ando (1910–2007), Japan – Instant noodles
- Hal Anger (1920–2005), U.S. – Well counter (radioactivity measurements), gamma camera
- Anders Knutsson Ångström (1888–1981), Sweden – Pyranometer
- Ottomar Anschütz (1846–1907), Germany – single-curtain focal-plane shutter, electrotachyscope
- Hermann Anschütz-Kaempfe (1872–1931), Germany – Gyrocompass
- Virginia Apgar (1909–1974), U.S. – Apgar score (for newborn babies)
- Nicolas Appert (1749–1841), France – canning (food preservation) using glass bottles, see also Peter Durand
- Archimedes (c. 287–212 BC), Greece – Archimedes' screw
- Guido of Arezzo (c. 991–c. 1033), Italy – Guidonian notation, see musical notation and also staff (music)
- Ami Argand (1750–1803), France – Argand lamp
- William George Armstrong (1810–1900), UK – hydraulic accumulator
- Neil Arnott (1788–1874), UK – waterbed
- Emil Artin (1889–1962), Armenia/Austria/Germany – modern abstract algebra
- Joseph Aspdin (1788–1855), UK – Portland cement
- John Vincent Atanasoff (1903–1995), Bulgaria/U.S. – electronic digital computer
- Marcel Audiffren, France – refrigeration, patent
- Alexander Anim-Mensah, Ghanaian/American – Chemical engineer, inventor

=== B ===
- Boris Babayan (born 1933), Armenia/USSR/Russia – Soviet computers, Superscalar processor
- Charles Babbage (1791–1871), UK – Analytical engine (semi-automatic)
- Tabitha Babbit (1779–1853), U.S. – Saw mill circular saw
- Victor Babeș (1854–1926), Romania – Babesia, the founder of serum therapy
- Leo Baekeland (1863–1944), Belgian–American – Velox photographic paper and Bakelite
- Ralph H. Baer (1922–2014), German born American – video game console
- Adolf von Baeyer (1835–1917), Germany – Fluorescein, synthetic Indigo dye, Phenolphthalein
- John Logie Baird (1888–1946), Scotland – World's first working television, 26 January 1926 and electronic colour television
- Abi Bakr of Isfahan (c. 1235), Persia/Iran – mechanical geared astrolabe with lunisolar calendar
- George Ballas (1925–2011), U.S. – String trimmer
- Oscar H. Banker (1895–1979), Armenia/U.S. – automatic transmission for automobiles
- Frederick Banting (1891–1941), Canada – technique to isolate Insulin
- Vladimir Baranov-Rossine (1888–1944), Russia/France – Optophonic Piano
- John Barber (1734–1801), UK – gas turbine
- John Bardeen (1908–1991), U.S. – co-inventor of the transistor, with Brattain and Schockley
- Vladimir Barmin (1909–1993), Russia – first rocket launch complex (spaceport)
- Anthony R. Barringer (1925–2009), Canada/U.S. – INPUT (Induced Pulse Transient) airborne electromagnetic system
- Earl W. Bascom (1906–1995), Canada/U.S. – rodeo bucking chute (1916 and 1919), rodeo bronc saddle (1922), rodeo bareback rigging (1924), rodeo riding chaps (1926)
- Nikolay Basov (1922–2001), Russia – co-inventor of laser and maser
- Patricia Bath (1942–2019), U.S. – laser cataract surgery
- Émile Baudot (1845–1903), France – Baudot code
- Eugen Baumann (1846–1896), Germany – PVC
- Trevor Baylis (1937–2018), UK – a wind-up radio
- Maria Beasley (1847–1904), U.S. – barrel-hooping machine, improved life raft
- Francis Beaufort (1774–1857), Ireland/UK – Beaufort scale, Beaufort cipher
- Hans Beck (1929–2009), Germany – inventor of Playmobil toys
- Arnold O. Beckman (1900–2004), U.S. – electric pH meter
- Vladimir Bekhterev (1857–1927), Russia – Bekhterev's Mixture
- Josip Belušić (1847–1905), Croatia – electric speedometer
- Michael Bell (born 1938), together with Melanie Chartoff (born 1950), U.S. – a gray water recycling device for reuse of shower and sink water in the home
- Alexander Graham Bell (1847–1922), UK, Canada, and U.S. – telephone
- Nikolay Benardos (1842–1905), Russian Empire – arc welding (specifically carbon arc welding, the first arc welding method)
- Ruth R. Benerito (1916–2013), U.S. – Permanent press (no-iron clothing)
- Miriam Benjamin (1861–1947), Washington, D.C. – Gong and signal chair (adopted by House of Representatives and precursor to flight attendant signal system)
- William R. Bennett Jr. (1930–2008), together with Ali Javan (1926–2016), U.S./Iran – Gas laser (Helium-Neon)
- Melitta Bentz (1873–1950), Germany – paper Coffee filter
- Karl Benz (1844–1929), Germany – the petrol-powered automobile
- Hans Berger (1873–1941), Germany – first human EEG and its development
- Friedrich Bergius (1884–1949), Germany – Bergius process (synthetic fuel from coal)
- Emile Berliner (1851–1929), Germany and U.S. – the disc record gramophone
- Tim Berners-Lee (born 1955), UK – with Robert Cailliau, the World Wide Web
- Marcellin Berthelot (1827–1907), France – Berthelot's reagent (chemistry)
- Heinrich Bertsch (1897–1981), Germany – first fully synthetic laundry detergent "Fewa" (chemistry)
- Charles Best (1899–1978), Canada – Insulin (chemistry)
- Max Bielschowsky (1869–1940), Germany – Bielschowsky stain (histology)
- Alfred Binet (1857–1911), France – with his student Théodore Simon (1872–1961), first practical Intelligence test
- Lucio Bini (1908–1964), together with Ugo Cerletti (1877–1963), Italy – Electroconvulsive therapy
- Gerd Binnig (born 1947), with Christoph Gerber, Calvin Quate and Heinrich Rohrer, Germany/Switzerland/U.S. – Atomic force microscope and Scanning tunneling microscope
- Clarence Birdseye (1886–1956), U.S. – Flash freezing
- László Bíró (1899–1985), Hungary – Ballpoint pen
- John Brislin (1838–1907), United States – Feeding mechanism for rolling mills
- Thor Bjørklund (1889–1975), Norway – Cheese slicer
- J. Stuart Blackton (1875–1941), U.S. – Stop-motion film
- Otto Blathy (1860–1939), Hungary – co-inventor of the transformer, wattmeter, alternating current (AC) and turbogenerator
- John Blenkinsop (1783–1831), UK – Blenkinsop rack railway system
- Charles K. Bliss (1897–1985), Austro-Hungary/Australia – Blissymbols
- Katharine Burr Blodgett (1898–1979), U.S. – nonreflective glass
- Alan Blumlein (1903–1942), UK – stereo
- David Boggs (1950–2022), U.S. – Ethernet
- Nils Bohlin (1920–2002), Sweden – the three-point seat belt
- Sarah Boone (1832–1908), U.S. – improved ironing board design
- Charlie Booth (1903–2008), Australia – Starting blocks
- Bob Born (1924–2023), U.S. – automated marshmallow confection production
- Sam Born (1891–1959), Russia/U.S. – lollipop-making machine
- Jagdish Chandra Bose (1858–1937), India – Crescograph
- Matthew Piers Watt Boulton (1820–1894), UK – aileron
- Seth Boyden (1788–1870), U.S. – nail-making machine
- Herbert Boyer (born 1936), together with Paul Berg (1926–2023), and Stanley Norman Cohen (born 1935), U.S. – created first Genetically modified organism
- Willard Boyle (1924–2011) together with George E. Smith (1930–2025), U.S. – Charge-coupled device (CCD)
- Hugh Bradner (1915–2008), U.S. – Wetsuit
- Louis Braille (1809–1852), France – Braille writing system, Braille musical notation
- Archie Brain (born 1942), UK – Laryngeal mask
- Jacques E. Brandenberger (1872–1954), Switzerland – Cellophane
- Édouard Branly (1844–1940), France – Coherer
- Charles F. Brannock (1903–1992), U.S. – Brannock Device (shoe size)
- Walter Houser Brattain (1902–1987), U.S. – co-inventor of the transistor
- Karl Ferdinand Braun (1850–1918), Germany – cathode-ray tube oscilloscope
- Wernher von Braun (1912–1977), Germany/U.S. – V-2 rocket, Saturn V rocket
- Stanislav Brebera (1925–2012), Czech Republic – Semtex explosive
- David Brewster (1781–1868), UK – Kaleidoscope
- Charles B. Brooks (1865–1908), U.S. – first self-propelled street sweeping truck
- Rachel Fuller Brown (1898–1980), U.S. – Nystatin, the world's first antifungal antibiotic
- William C. Brown (1916–1999), U.S. – crossed-field amplifier
- Marie Van Brittan Brown (1922–1999), U.S. – home security system
- Friedrich Wilhelm Gustav Bruhn (1853–1927), Germany – Taximeter
- Nikolay Brusentsov (1925–2014), USSR, Russia – ternary computer (Setun)
- Dudley Allen Buck (1927–1959), U.S. – Cryotron, content-addressable memory
- Edwin Beard Budding (1795–1846), UK – lawnmower
- Gersh Budker (1918–1977), Russia – electron cooling, co-inventor of collider
- Edward Bull (1759–1798), England – Bull engine (a modified steam engine)
- Robert Bunsen (1811–1899), Germany – Bunsen burner
- Henry Burden (1791–1871), Scotland and U.S. – Horseshoe machine, first usable iron railroad spike

=== C ===
- Ve Elizabeth Cadie (1893–1956), U.S. – heat insulating handle for small home appliances
- Herminie Cadolle (1845–1926), France – modern brassiere
- Robert Cailliau (born 1947), Belgium – with Tim Berners-Lee, the World Wide Web
- Edward A. Calahan (1838–1912), U.S. – Stock ticker tape
- Nicholas Callan (1799–1864), Ireland – Induction coil
- Spéranza Calo-Séailles (1885–1949), Greece – "Lap" decorative concrete
- Alan Archibald Campbell-Swinton (1863–1930), Scotland – Television
- Tullio Campagnolo (1901–1983), Italy – Quick release skewer
- Charles Cantor (born 1942), U.S. – Pulsed-field gel electrophoresis (molecular biology)
- Mario Ramberg Capecchi (born 1937), together with Sir Martin John Evans (born 1941), and Oliver Smithies (1925–2017), U.S. – Gene targeting
- Roxey Ann Caplin (1793–1888), UK – Victorian-style corset
- Arturo Caprotti (1881–1938), Italy – Caprotti valve gear
- Gerolamo Cardano (1501–1576), Italy – Cardan grille (cryptography)
- Philip Cardew (1851–1910), UK – Hot-wire galvanometer
- Chester Carlson (1906–1968), U.S. – Xerographic copier
- Wallace Carothers (1896–1937), U.S. – Nylon and Neoprene (together with Arnold Collins)
- Antonio Benedetto Carpano (1764–1815), Italy – Vermouth
- Mary P. Carpenter (1840–1900), U.S. – mosquito nets, mosquito traps
- Giovanni Caselli (1815–1891), Italy/France – Pantelegraph
- George Cayley (1773–1857), UK – tension-spoke wheels
- Anders Celsius (1701–1744), Sweden – Celsius temperature scale
- Vint Cerf (born 1943), together with Bob Kahn (1938–), U.S. – Internet Protocol (IP)
- Claude Shannon (1916–2016), founder of information theory and modern cryptography, invented Minivac 601, and co-invented the first wearable computer (with Edward O. Thorp)
- Ugo Cerletti (1877–1963), together with Lucio Bini (1908–1964), Italy – Electroconvulsive therapy
- Leona Chalmers (c. 1937), U.S. – modern menstrual cup
- Charles Chamberland (1851–1908), France – Chamberland filter
- Min Chueh Chang (1908–1991), together with Gregory Goodwin Pincus (1903–1967), U.S./China – Combined oral contraceptive pill
- Thomas Chang (born 1933), Canada/China – Artificial cell
- Chang Yŏngsil (c. 1390–after 1442), South Korea (Joseon dynasty) – Jagyeokru (Water clock) and Ch'ŭgugi (rain gauge)
- Emmett Chapman (1936–2021), U.S. – Chapman Stick
- Claude Chappe (1763–1805), France – Semaphore line
- Melanie Chartoff (born 1950), together with Michael Bell (born 1938), U.S. – a gray water recycling device for reuse of shower and sink water in the home
- David Chaum (born 1955), U.S. – Digital signatures, ecash
- Vladimir Chelomey (1914–1984), USSR – First space station (Salyut)
- Joyce Chen (1917–1994), China – stir fry pan
- Pavel Cherenkov (1904–1990), USSR – Cherenkov detector
- Evgeniy Chertovsky (1902–1961), Russia – pressure suit
- Alicia Chong Rodriguez – American engineer and inventor
- Chŏng Yagyong (1762–1836), South Korea (Joseon dynasty) – Geojunggi (crane)
- Ward Christensen (1945–2024), U.S. – Bulletin board system
- Ole Kirk Christiansen (1891–1958), Denmark – Creator of Lego
- Samuel Hunter Christie (1784–1865), UK – Wheatstone bridge
- Juan de la Cierva (1895–1936), Spain – the autogyro
- Charles Clagget (1740–1795), UK – Improvements for musical instruments
- Leland Clark (1918–2005), U.S. – Clark electrode (medicine)
- Georges Claude (1870–1960), France – neon lamp
- Adelaide Claxton (fl 1860s–1890s), UK – ear caps
- Madame Clicquot Ponsardin (1777–1866), France – Champagne riddling
- Henri Marie Coandă (1886–1972), Romania – Coandă effect
- Josephine Cochrane (1839–1913), U.S. – dishwasher
- Christopher Cockerell (1910–1999), UK – Hovercraft
- Aeneas Coffey (1780–1852), Ireland – Coffey still
- Sir Henry Cole (1808–1882), UK – Christmas card
- Samuel Colt (1814–1862), U.S. – Revolver development
- Margaret P. Colvin (1820-1894), U.S. - the Triumph Rotary Washer
- Sir William Congreve (1772–1828), UK – Congreve rocket
- George Constantinescu (1881–1965), Romania – creator of the theory of sonics, a new branch of continuum mechanics
- Albert Coons (1912–1978), U.S. – Immunofluorescence (microscopy)
- Martin Cooper (born 1928), U.S. – Mobile phone
- Harry Coover (1917–2011), U.S. – Super Glue
- Lloyd Groff Copeman (1865–1956), U.S. – Electric stove
- Cornelis Corneliszoon (1550–1607), The Netherlands – wind powered sawmill
- Martha Coston (1826–1904), U.S. — inventor of signal flares used at sea
- Alexander Coucoulas (born 1933), U.S. – Thermosonic bonding
- Wallace H. Coulter (1913–1998), U.S. – Coulter principle
- Jacques Cousteau (1910–1997), France – co-inventor of the aqualung and the Nikonos underwater camera
- John "Jack" Higson Cover Jr. (1920–2009), U.S. – Taser
- Minnie Crabb (1885–1974), Australia – Crabb-Hulme Braille Printing Press
- Marian Croak (born 1955), U.S. – many patents related to voice over IP (VoIP)
- William Crookes (1832–1919), UK – Crookes radiometer, Crookes tube
- Bartolomeo Cristofori (1655–1731), Italy – piano
- Caresse Crosby (1891–1970), U.S. – Modern bra
- S. Scott Crump (inv. c. 1989), U.S. – fused deposition modeling
- Nicolas-Joseph Cugnot (1725–1804), France – first steam-powered road vehicle
- William Cullen (1710–1790), UK – first artificial refrigerator
- Rose Cumming (1887–1968), U.S. – metallic wallpaper
- Emily Cummins (born 1987), UK – sustainable refrigerator, water carrier, toothpaste dispenser
- Marie Curie (1867–1934), Poland – portable X-ray units ("Little Curies"), radium-emanation needles
- Jan Czochralski (1885–1953), Poland / Germany – Czochralski process (crystal growth)

=== D ===
- Nils Gustaf Dalén (1869–1937), Sweden – AGA cooker, Dalén light, Agamassan, Sun valve for lighthouses and buoys
- John Frederic Daniell (1790–1845), UK – Daniell cell
- Corradino D'Ascanio (1891–1981), Italy – Vespa scooter
- Leonardo da Vinci (1452–1519), Italy – helicopter, tanks, and parachutes for safety
- Raymond Damadian (1936–2022), Armenia/U.S. – Magnetic resonance imaging (MRI)
- Robert Davidson (1804–1894), Scotland – electric locomotive
- Jacob Davis (1868–1908), U.S. – Riveted jeans
- Humphry Davy (1778–1829), UK – Davy miners lamp
- Joseph Day (1855–1946), UK – the crankcase-compression two-stroke engine
- Lee de Forest (1873–1961), U.S. – Phonofilm, triode
- Yuri Nikolaevich Denisyuk (1927–2006), Russia – 3D holography
- Robert H. Dennard (1932–2024), U.S. – Dynamic random-access memory (DRAM)
- Miksa Déri (1854–1938), Hungary – co-inventor of an improved closed-core transformer
- Robert DeStefano (born 1962), U.S. – exercise equipment
- James Dewar (1842–1923), UK – Thermos flask
- Aleksandr Dianin (1851–1918), Russia – Bisphenol A, Dianin's compound
- William Kennedy Laurie Dickson (1860–1935), UK – motion picture camera
- Philip Diehl (1847–1913), U.S. – Ceiling fan
- Rudolf Diesel (1858–1913), Germany – Diesel engine
- William H. Dobelle (1943–2004), U.S. – Dobelle Eye
- Johann Wolfgang Döbereiner (1780–1849), Germany – Döbereiner's lamp (chemistry)
- Toshitada Doi (born 1943), Japan, together with Joop Sinjou, Netherlands – Compact disc
- Ray Dolby (1933–2013), U.S. – Dolby noise-reduction system
- Mikhail Dolivo-Dobrovolsky (1862–1919), Poland/Russia – three-phase electric power
- Marion O'Brien Donovan (1917–1998), U.S. – Waterproof diaper
- Hub van Doorne (1900–1979), Netherlands – Variomatic continuously variable transmission
- John Thompson Dorrance (1873–1930), U.S. – Condensed soup
- Amanda Minnie Douglas (1831–1916) – writer and inventor (portable folding mosquito net frame)
- Charles Dow (1851–1902), U.S. – Dow Jones Industrial Average
- Mulalo Doyoyo (1970–2024), South Africa/U.S. – Cenocell – cementless concrete
- Anastase Dragomir (1896–1966), Romania – Ejection seat
- Karl Drais (1785–1851), Germany – dandy horse, Draisine
- Richard Drew (1899–1980), U.S. – Masking tape
- John Boyd Dunlop (1840–1921), UK – first practical pneumatic tyre
- Cyril Duquet (1841–1922), Canada – Telephone handset
- Alexey Dushkin (1904–1977), Russia – deep column station
- James Dyson (born 1947), UK – Dual Cyclone bagless vacuum cleaner, incorporating the principles of cyclonic separation.

=== E ===
- George Eastman (1854–1932), U.S. – roll film
- J. Presper Eckert (1919–1995), U.S. – ENIAC – the first general purpose programmable digital computer
- Thomas Edison (1847–1931), U.S. – phonograph, commercially practical incandescent light bulb, etc.
- Pehr Victor Edman (1916–1977), Sweden – Edman degradation for Protein sequencing
- Sir Robert Geoffrey Edwards (1925–2013), UK – In vitro fertilisation
- Ellen Eglin (1849–c. 1890), U.S. – Clothes wringer
- Brendan Eich (born 1961), U.S. – JavaScript (programming language)
- Willem Einthoven (1860–1927), The Netherlands – the electrocardiogram
- Benjamin Eisenstadt (1906–1996), U.S. – Sugar packet
- Paul Eisler (1907–1992), Austria/U.S. – Printed circuit board (electronics)
- Giorgi Eliava (1892–1937), together with Félix d'Herelle (1873–1949), France / Georgia – Phage therapy
- Ivan Elmanov, Russia – first monorail (horse-drawn)
- Rune Elmqvist (1906–1996), Sweden – implantable pacemaker
- John Haven Emerson (1906–1997), U.S. – iron lung
- Douglas Engelbart (1925–2013), U.S. – the computer mouse
- Michael D. Ercolino (1906–1982), U.S. – TV antenna's
- John Ericsson (1803–1889), Sweden – the two screw-propeller
- Emil Erlenmeyer (1825–1909), Germany – Erlenmeyer flask
- Sir Martin John Evans (born 1941), together with Mario Ramberg Capecchi (born 1937), and Oliver Smithies (1925–2017), U.S. – Knockout mouse, Gene targeting
- Ole Evinrude (1877–1934), Norway – outboard motor

=== F ===
- Charles Fabry (1867–1945), together with Alfred Perot (1863–1925), France – Fabry–Pérot interferometer (physics)
- Samuel Face (1923–2001), U.S. – concrete flatness/levelness technology; Lightning Switch
- Federico Faggin (born 1941), Italy – microprocessor
- Daniel Gabriel Fahrenheit (1686–1736), The Netherlands – Fahrenheit temperature scale, Mercury-in-glass thermometer
- Michael Faraday (1791–1867), UK – electric transformer, electric motor
- Johann Maria Farina (1685–1766), Germany – Eau de Cologne
- Myra Juliet Farrell (1878–1957), Australia – stitchless button, Press stud
- Philo Farnsworth (1906–1971), U.S. – electronic television
- Marga Faulstich (1915–1998), Germany – optical glass, lightweight lens SF 64
- Muhammad al-Fazari (died 796/806), Persia – astrolabe
- John Bennett Fenn (1917–2010), U.S. – Electrospray ionization
- Henry John Horstman Fenton (1854–1929), UK – Fenton's reagent (chemistry)
- James Fergason (1934–2008), U.S. – improved liquid-crystal display
- Enrico Fermi (1901–1954), Italy – nuclear reactor
- Humberto Fernández-Morán (1924–1999), Venezuela – Diamond scalpel, Ultra microtome
- Michele Ferrero (1925–2015), Italy – Kinder Surprise = Kinder Eggs, Nutella
- Bran Ferren (born 1953), U.S. – Pinch-to-zoom (multi-touch), together with Daniel Hillis
- Reginald Fessenden (1866–1932), Canada – two-way radio
- Robert Feulgen (1884–1955), Germany – Feulgen stain (histology)
- Adolf Gaston Eugen Fick (1829–1901), Germany – contact lens
- Ethel Finck (1932–2003), U.S. – cardiac catheter
- Abbas Ibn Firnas (810–887), Al-Andalus – fused quartz and silica glass, metronome
- Artur Fischer (1919–2016) Germany – fasteners including fischertechnik.
- Franz Joseph Emil Fischer (1877–1947), together with Hans Tropsch (1889–1935), Germany – Fischer assay (oil yield test) and Fischer–Tropsch process (refinery process)
- Gerhard Fischer (1899–1988), Germany/U.S. – hand-held metal detector
- Paul C. Fisher (1913–2006), U.S. – Space Pen
- Edith M. Flanigen (born 1929), U.S. – zeolite Y, molecular sieve
- Alexander Fleming (1881–1955), Scotland – Penicillin
- John Ambrose Fleming (1848–1945), UK – Vacuum diode
- Sandford Fleming (1827–1915), Canada – Universal Standard Time
- Nicolas Florine (1891–1972), Georgia/Russia/Belgium – first tandem rotor helicopter to fly freely
- Tommy Flowers (1905–1998), UK – Colossus – early electronic computer
- Irmgard Flügge-Lotz (1903–1974), U.S. – aircraft guidance systems
- Thomas J. Fogarty (born 1934), U.S. – Embolectomy catheter (medicine)
- Larry Fondren, U.S. – entrepreneur, inventor and credit markets expert
- Eunice Newton Foote (1819–1888), U.S. – greenhouse effect, boot soles
- Enrico Forlanini (1848–1930), Italy – Steam helicopter, hydrofoil, Forlanini airships
- Eric Fossum (born 1957), U.S. – intra-pixel charge transfer in CMOS image sensors
- Josephine G. Fountain (fl 1960), U.S. – direct suction tracheotomy tube
- Jean Bernard Léon Foucault (1819–1868), France – Foucault pendulum, gyroscope, eddy current
- Benoît Fourneyron (1802–1867), France – water turbine
- John Fowler (1826–1864), UK – steam-driven ploughing engine
- Benjamin Franklin (1706–1790), U.S. – the pointed lightning rod conductor, bifocal glasses, the Franklin stove, the glass harmonica
- Herman Frasch (1851–1914), Germany / U.S. – Frasch process (petrochemistry), Paraffin wax purification
- Ian Hector Frazer (born 1953), together with Jian Zhou (1957–1999), U.S./China – HPV vaccine against cervical cancer
- Helen Murray Free (1923–2021), U.S. – diabetes tests
- Augustin-Jean Fresnel (1788–1827), France – Fresnel lens
- Amelia Freund (1824–1887), Germany – cooking stove contained a "frizzler" which fried without hardening.
- Ida Freund (1863–1914), UK – gas measuring tube, periodic table cupcakes
- William Friese-Greene (1855–1921), UK – cinematography
- Julius Fromm (1883–1945), Germany – first seamless Condom
- Arthur Fry (born 1931), U.S. – Post-it note
- Buckminster Fuller (1895–1983), U.S. – geodesic dome
- C. W. Fuller (inv. 1953), U.S. – Gilhoolie
- Robert Fulton (1765–1815), United States – first commercially successful steamboat, first practical submarine
- Ivan Fyodorov (c. 1510–1583), Russia/Poland–Lithuania – invented multibarreled mortar, introduced printing in Russia
- Svyatoslav Fyodorov (1927–2000), Russia – radial keratotomy
- Vladimir Fyodorov (1874–1966), Russia – Fedorov Avtomat (first self-loading battle rifle, arguably the first assault rifle)

=== G ===
- Dennis Gabor (1900–1979), Hungarian-British – holography
- Boris Borisovich Galitzine (1862–1916), Russia – electromagnetic seismograph
- Joseph G. Gall (1928–2024), U.S. – In situ hybridization (cell biology)
- Alfred William Gallagher (1911–1990), New Zealand – Electric fence for farmers
- Dmitri Garbuzov (1940–2006), Russia/U.S. – continuous-wave-operating diode lasers (together with Zhores Alferov), high-power diode lasers
- Elmer R. Gates (1859–1923), U.S. – foam fire extinguisher, electric loom mechanisms, magnetic & diamagnetic separators, educational toy ("box & blocks")*
- Richard J. Gatling (1818–1903), U.S. – wheat drill, first successful machine gun
- Georgy Gause (1910–1986), Russia – gramicidin S, neomycin, lincomycin and other antibiotics
- E. K. Gauzen, Russia – three bolt equipment (early diving costume)
- Norman Gaylord (1923–2007), U.S. – rigid gas-permeable contact lens
- Karl-Hermann Geib (1908–1949), Germany / USSR – Girdler sulfide process
- King Camp Gillette (1855–1932), U.S. – Double-edge safety razor and blade
- Hans Wilhelm Geiger (1882–1945), Germany – Geiger counter
- Andrey Geim (born 1958), Russia/United Kingdom – graphene
- Nestor Genko (1839–1904), Russia – Genko's Forest Belt (the first large-scale windbreak system)
- Christoph Gerber (born 1942), with Calvin Quate (1923–2019), and with Gerd Binnig (1947–), Germany/U.S./Switzerland – Atomic force microscope
- Friedrich Clemens Gerke (1801–1888), Germany – current international Morse code
- David Gestetner (1854–1939), Austria-Hungary / UK – Gestetner copier
- Alberto Gianni (1891–1930), Italy – Torretta butoscopica
- John Heysham Gibbon (1903–1973), U.S. – Heart-lung machine
- Gustav Giemsa (1867–1948), Germany – Giemsa stain (histology)
- Adolph Giesl-Gieslingen (1903–1992), Austria – Giesl ejector
- Henri Giffard (1825–1882), France – powered airship, injector
- David J. Gingery (1932–2004), USA
- Donald A. Glaser (1926–2013), U.S. – Bubble chamber
- Joseph Glass (1791–1867), England – chimney-sweeping apparatus
- Valentyn Glushko (1908–1989), USSR/Ukraine/Russia – hypergolic propellant, electric propulsion, Soviet rocket engines (including world's most powerful liquid-fuel rocket engine RD-170)
- Heinrich Göbel (1818–1893), Germany – incandescent lamp
- Leonid Gobyato (1875–1915), Russia – man-portable mortar
- Robert Goddard (1882–1945), U.S. – liquid fuel rocket
- Sam Golden (1915–1997), together with Leonard Bocour (1910–1993), U.S. – Acrylic paint
- Peter Carl Goldmark (1906–1977), Hungary – vinyl record (LP), CBS color television
- Camillo Golgi (1843–1926), Italy – Golgi's method (histology)
- György Gömöri (1904–1957), Hungary / U.S. – Gömöri trichrome stain, Gömöri methenamine silver stain (histology)
- Lewis Gompertz (c. 1783–1861), UK – expanding chuck, improved velocipede
- Sarah E. Goode (1855–1905), US – cabinet bed. First African-American woman to receive a United States patent.
- Charles Goodyear (1800–1860), U.S. – vulcanization of rubber
- Praveen Kumar Gorakavi (born 1989), India – low-cost Braille Typewriter
- Robert W. Gore (1937–2020), U.S. – Gore-Tex
- Igor Gorynin (1926–2015), Russia – weldable titanium alloys, high strength aluminium alloys, radiation-hardened steels
- James Gosling (born 1955), U.S. – Java (programming language)
- Gordon Gould (1920–2005), U.S. – Laser, see also Theodore Maiman
- Richard Hall Gower (1768–1833), UK – ship's hull and rigging
- Boris Grabovsky (1901–1966), Russia – cathode commutator, an early electronic TV pickup tube
- Bette Nesmith Graham (1924–1980), U.S. – Correction fluid, Liquid Paper
- Iréne Grahn (1945–2013), Sweden – finger joint support for patients with rheumatoid arthritis
- Hans Christian Gram (1853–1938), Denmark / Germany – Gram staining (histology)
- Zénobe Gramme (1826–1901), Belgium/France – Gramme dynamo
- Temple Grandin (born 1947), squeeze machine and humane abattoirs
- Michael Grätzel (born 1944), Germany/Switzerland – Dye-sensitized solar cell
- James Henry Greathead (1844–1896), South Africa – tunnel boring machine, tunnelling shield technique
- Chester Greenwood (1858–1937), U.S. – thermal earmuffs
- Lori Greiner (born 1969), U.S. – Silver Safekeeper anti-tarnish lining (jewelry organizers) and multiple consumer products, 120 US and foreign patents
- James Gregory (1638–1675), Scotland – Gregorian telescope
- William Griggs (1832–1911), England – a process of photolithography
- Helmut Gröttrup (1916–1981), Germany – smart card, systems for banknote processing
- William Robert Grove (1811–1896), Wales – fuel cell
- Gustav Guanella (1909–1982), Switzerland – DSSS, Guanella-Balun
- Otto von Guericke (1602–1686), Germany – vacuum pump, manometer, dasymeter
- Sarah Guppy (1770–1852), United Kingdom – bridge/railroad building, tea and coffee urn, barnacle prevention for boats, long lasting candlestick
- Mikhail Gurevich (1893–1976), Russia – MiG-series fighter aircraft, including world's most produced jet aircraft MiG-15 and most produced supersonic aircraft MiG-21 (together with Artem Mikoyan)
- Goldsworthy Gurney (1793–1875), England – Gurney Stove
- Bartolomeu de Gusmão (1685–1724), Brazil – early air balloons
- Johann Gutenberg (c. 1398–1468), Germany – movable type printing press
- Samuel Guthrie (physician) (1782–1848), U.S. – discovered chloroform

=== H ===
- Fritz Haber (1868–1934), Germany – Haber process (ammonia synthesis)
- John Hadley (1682–1744), UK – octant
- Waldemar Haffkine (1860–1930), Russia/Switzerland – first anti-cholera and anti-plague vaccines
- Gunther von Hagens (born 1945), Germany – whole body Plastination
- Charles Hall (1863–1914), U.S. – aluminum production
- Robert N. Hall (1919–2016), U.S. – Semiconductor laser
- Samuel Hall (1782–1863), UK – condenser to enable recycling of water in a ship's steam engine
- Tracy Hall (1919–2008), U.S. – synthetic diamond
- Nicholas Halse (died 1636), England – malt kiln
- Richard Hamming (1915–1998), U.S. – Hamming code
- John Hays Hammond Jr. (1888–1965), U.S. – radio control
- Ruth Handler (1916–2002), U.S. – Barbie doll
- James Hargreaves (1720–1778), UK – spinning jenny
- John Harington (1561–1612), UK – the flush toilet
- William Snow Harris (1791–1867), UK – much improved naval Lightning rods
- John Harrison (1693–1776), UK – marine chronometer
- Ross Granville Harrison (1870–1959), U.S. – first successful animal Tissue culture, Cell culture
- Kazuo Hashimoto (died 1995), Japan – Caller-ID, answering machine
- Victor Hasselblad (1906–1978), Sweden – the 6 x 6 cm single-lens reflex camera
- Ibn al-Haytham (Alhazen) (965–1039), Iraq – camera obscura, pinhole camera, magnifying glass
- George H. Heilmeier (1936–2014), U.S. – liquid-crystal display (LCD)
- Henry Heimlich (1920–2016), U.S. – Heimlich maneuver
- Robert A. Heinlein (1907–1988), U.S. – waterbed
- Jozef Karol Hell (1713–1789), Slovakia – the water pillar
- Rudolf Hell (1901–2002), Germany – the Hellschreiber
- Hermann von Helmholtz (1821–1894), Germany – Helmholtz pitch notation, Helmholtz resonator, ophthalmoscope
- Zhang Heng (78–139), China – Seismometer, first hydraulic-powered armillary sphere
- Beulah Louise Henry (1887–1973), U.S. – bobbin-free sewing machine, vacuum ice cream freezer
- Charles H. Henry (1937–2016), U.S. – Quantum well laser
- Joseph Henry (1797–1878), Scotland/U.S. – electromagnetic relay
- Félix d'Herelle (1873–1949), together with Giorgi Eliava (1892–1937), France, Georgia – Phage therapy
- Heron (c. 10–70), Roman Egypt – usually credited with invention of the aeolipile, although it may have been described a century earlier
- John Herschel (1792–1871), UK – photographic fixer (hypo), actinometer
- Harry Houdini (1874–1926) U.S. – flight time illusion
- Heinrich Hertz (1857–1894), Germany – radio telegraphy, electromagnetic radiation
- Ephraim Hertzano (1912–1987), Roumania / Israel – Rummikub
- Lasse Hessel (1940–2019), Denmark – female condom
- George de Hevesy (1885–1966), Hungary – radioactive tracer
- Ronald Price Hickman (1932–2011), U.S. – designed the original Lotus Elan, the Lotus Elan +2 and the Lotus Europa, as well as the Black & Decker Workmate
- Rowland Hill (1795–1879), UK – postage stamp
- Maurice Hilleman (1919–2005) – vaccines against childhood diseases
- Tanaka Hisashige (1799–1881), Japan – Myriad year clock
- Ted Hoff (born 1937), U.S. – microprocessor
- Felix Hoffmann (Bayer) (1868–1949), Germany – aspirin
- Albert Hofmann (1906–2008), Switzerland – LSD
- Kotaro Honda (1870–1954), Japan – KS steel
- Huang Hongjia (1924–2021), China – single-mode optical fiber
- Herman Hollerith (1860–1929), U.S. – recording data on a machine-readable medium, tabulator, punched cards
- Nick Holonyak (1928–2022), U.S. – LED (Light Emitting Diode)
- Norman Holter (1914–1983), U.S. – Holter monitor
- Robert Hooke (1635–1703), UK – balance wheel, iris diaphragm, acoustic telephone
- Erna Schneider Hoover (born 1926), U.S. – computerized telephone switching system
- Harold Hopkins (1918–1994), UK – zoom lens, rod lens endoscope
- Grace Murray Hopper (1906–1992), U.S. – compiler
- Frank Hornby (1863–1936), UK – invented Meccano
- Jimmy Hotz (1953–2023), U.S. – Hotz MIDI Translator, Atari Hotz Box
- Royal Earl House (1814–1895), U.S. – first Printing telegraph
- Coenraad Johannes van Houten (1801–1887), Netherlands – cocoa powder, cacao butter, chocolate milk
- Elias Howe (1819–1867), U.S. – sewing machine
- David Edward Hughes (1831–1900), UK – printing telegraph
- Kate Duval Hughes (born 1837) – window sash security devices
- Chuck Hull (born 1939), U.S. – 3D printer
- Troy Hurtubise (1963–2018), Canada – Trojan Ballistics Suit of Armor, Ursus suit, Firepaste, Angel Light
- Miller Reese Hutchison (1876–1944), U.S. – Klaxon, electric hearing aid
- Christiaan Huygens (1629–1695), Netherlands – pendulum clock
- John Wesley Hyatt (1837–1920), U.S. – celluloid manufacturing

=== I ===
- Gavriil Ilizarov (1921–1992), Russia – Ilizarov apparatus, external fixation, distraction osteogenesis
- Mamoru Imura (born 1948), Japan – RFIQin (automatic cooking device)
- Daisuke Inoue (born 1940), Japan – Karaoke machine
- János Irinyi (1817–1895), Hungary – noiseless match
- Ub Iwerks (1901–1971), U. S. – multiplane camera for animation

=== J ===
- Moritz von Jacobi (1801–1874), Germany/Russia – electrotyping, electric boat
- Rudolf Jaenisch (born 1942), Germany/U.S. – first Genetically modified mouse
- Alcinous Burton Jamison (1851–1938), American physician, inventor of medical devices
- Karl Guthe Jansky (1905–1950), U.S. – radio telescope
- Karl Jatho (1873–1933), Germany – aeroplane
- Ali Javan (1926–2016), together with William R. Bennett Jr. (1930–2008), Iran/U.S. – Gas laser (Helium-Neon)
- Al-Jazari (1136–1206), Iraq – elephant clock, humanoid robots
- Ibn Al-Jazzar (Algizar) (895–979), Tunisia – sexual dysfunction and erectile dysfunction treatment drugs
- Ányos Jedlik (1800–1898), Hungary – Jedlik dynamo
- Alec John Jeffreys (born 1950), UK – DNA profiling (forensics)
- Charles Francis Jenkins (1867–1934), U.S. – television and movie projector (Phantoscope)
- Thomas L. Jennings (1791–1859), U.S. – novel method of dry cleaning
- Steve Jobs (1955–2011), U.S. – Apple Macintosh computer, iPod, iPhone, iPad and other devices, software operating systems and applications.
- Amos Edward Joel Jr. (1918–2008) U.S. – electrical engineer, known for several contributions and over seventy patents related to telecommunications switching systems
- Carl Edvard Johansson (1864–1943), Sweden – Gauge blocks
- Johan Petter Johansson (1853–1943), Sweden – Pipe wrench and adjustable spanner
- Reynold B. Johnson (1906–1998), U.S. – Hard disk drive
- Philipp von Jolly (1809–1884), Germany – Jolly balance
- Scott A. Jones (born 1960), U.S. – created one of the most successful versions of voicemail as well as ChaCha Search, a human-assisted internet search engine
- Tom Parry Jones (1935–2013), UK – first electronic Breathalyzer
- Assen Jordanoff (1896–1967), Bulgaria – airbag
- Anatol Josepho (1894–1980), patented the first coin-operated photo booth called the "Photomaton" in 1925
- Marjorie Joyner (1896–1994), U.S. – Permanent wave machine
- Whitcomb Judson (1836–1909), U.S. – zipper
- Percy Lavon Julian (1899–1975), U.S. – chemical synthesis of medicinal drugs from plants
- Ma Jun (fl. 220–265), China – south-pointing chariot (see differential gear), mechanical puppet theater, chain pumps, improved silk looms

=== K ===
- Mikhail Kalashnikov (1919–2013), Russia – AK-47 and AK-74 assault rifles (the most produced ever)
- Bob Kahn (born 1938), together with Vint Cerf (born 1943), U.S. – Internet Protocol (TCP/IP)
- Dawon Kahng (1931–1992), South Korea, together with Simon Sze (1936–2023), Taiwan/U.S. – Floating-gate MOSFET
- Dean Kamen (born 1951), U.S. – Invented the Segway HT scooter and the IBOT Mobility Device
- Heike Kamerlingh Onnes (1853–1926), Netherlands – liquid helium
- Nikolay Kamov (1902–1973), Russia – armored battle autogyro, Ka-series coaxial rotor helicopters
- Pyotr Kapitsa (1894–1984), Russia – first ultrastrong magnetic field creating techniques, basic low-temperature physics inventions
- Georgii Karpechenko (1899–1941), Russia – rabbage (the first ever non-sterile hybrid obtained through the crossbreeding)
- Mihran Kassabian (1870–1910), Armenia/U.S. – Medical use of X-Rays
- Jamshīd al-Kāshī (c. 1380–1429), Persia/Iran – plate of conjunctions, analog planetary computer
- Andrew Kay (1919–2014), U.S. – Digital voltmeter
- Adolphe Kégresse (1879–1943), France/Russia – Kégresse track (first half-track and first off-road vehicle with continuous track), dual-clutch transmission
- Carl D. Keith (1920–2008), together with John J. Mooney (1930–2020), U.S. – three way catalytic converter
- Mstislav Keldysh (1911–1978), Latvia/Russia – co-developer of Sputnik 1 (the first artificial satellite) together with Korolyov and Tikhonravov
- John Harvey Kellogg (1852–1943), cornflake breakfasts
- John G. Kemeny (1926–1992), together with Thomas E. Kurtz (1928–2024), Hungary/U.S. – BASIC (programming language)
- Alexander Kemurdzhian (1921–2003), Armenia/Russia/USSR – first space exploration rover (Lunokhod)
- Mary Kenner (1912–2006), U.S. – sanitary belt
- William Saville-Kent (1845–1908), UK/Australia – Pearl culture, see also Mikimoto Kōkichi
- Kerim Kerimov (1917–2003), Azerbaijan and Russia – co-developer of human spaceflight, space dock, space station
- Jacques de Kervor (1928–2010), France – industrial designer
- Charles F. Kettering (1876–1958), U.S. – invented automobile self-starter ignition, Freon ethyl gasoline and more
- Fazlur Khan (1929–1982), Bangladesh – structural systems for high-rise skyscrapers
- Yulii Khariton (1904–1996), Russia – chief designer of the Soviet atomic bomb, co-developer of the Tsar Bomba
- Anatoly Kharlampiyev (1906–1979), Russia – Sambo (martial art)
- Al-Khazini (fl.1115–1130), Persia/Iran – hydrostatic balance
- Konstantin Khrenov (1894–1984), Russia – underwater welding
- Abu-Mahmud Khojandi (c. 940–1000), Persia/Iran – astronomical sextant
- Muhammad ibn Musa al-Khwarizmi (Algoritmi) (c. 780–850), Persia/Iran – algebra, mural instrument, horary quadrant, Sine quadrant, shadow square
- Johann Kiefuss – inventor in Nuremberg in 1517
- Marcel Kiepach (1894–1915), Croatia – dynamo, maritime compass that indicates north regardless of the presence of iron or magnetic forces
- Mary Dixon Kies (1752–1837), U.S. – new technique of weaving straw with silk and thread to make hats
- Erhard Kietz (1909–1982), Germany & U.S. – signal improvements for video transmissions
- Jack Kilby (1923–2005), U.S. – patented the first integrated circuit
- Al-Kindi (Alkindus) (801–873), Iraq/Yemen – unambiguously described the distillation of wine in the 9th century, cryptanalysis, frequency analysis
- Petrus Jacobus Kipp (1808–1864), The Netherlands – Kipp's apparatus (chemistry)
- Semyon Kirlian (1898–1978), Armenia/USSR – Kirlian photography
- Steve Kirsch (born 1956), U.S. – Optical mouse
- Fritz Klatte (1880–1934), Germany – vinyl chloride, forerunner to polyvinyl chloride
- Yves Klein (1928–1962), France – International Klein Blue
- Margaret E. Knight (1838–1914), U.S. – machine that completely constructs box-bottom brown paper bags
- Tom Knight (?), U.S. – BioBricks (synthetic biology)
- Ivan Knunyants (1906–1990), Armenia/Russia/USSR – Soviet chemical weapons, capron, Nylon 6, polyamide-6
- Robert Koch (1843–1910), Germany – method for culturing bacteria on solid media
- Willem Johan Kolff (1911–2009), Netherlands – artificial kidney hemodialysis machine
- Rudolf Kompfner (1909–1977), U.S. – Traveling-wave tube
- Konstantin Konstantinov (1817/1819–1871), Russia – device for measuring flight speed of projectiles, ballistic rocket pendulum, launch pad, rocket-making machine
- Sergei Korolev (1907–1966), USSR – first successful intercontinental ballistic missile (R-7 Semyorka), R-7 rocket family, Sputniks (including the first Earth-orbiting artificial satellite), Vostok program (including the first human spaceflight)
- Nikolai Korotkov (1874–1920), Russian Empire – auscultatory technique for blood pressure measurement
- Semyon Korsakov (1787–1853), Russian Empire – punched card for information storage
- Mikhail Koshkin (1898–1940), Russia – T-34 medium tank, the best and most produced tank of World War II
- Ognjeslav Kostović (1851–1916), Serbia/Russia – arborite (high-strength plywood, an early plastic)
- Gleb Kotelnikov (1872–1944), Russia – knapsack parachute, drogue parachute
- William Justin Kroll (1889–1973), Luxemburg/U.S. – Kroll process
- Alfred Krupa (1915–1989), Yugoslavia – the modern wheeled suitcase, a glass-bottom boat, the skis for use in walking on water, a folding canvas catamaran
- Aleksey Krylov (1863–1945), Russia – gyroscopic damping of ships
- Ivan Kulibin (1735–1818), Russia – egg-shaped clock, candle searchlight, elevator using screw mechanisms, a self-rolling carriage featuring a flywheel, brake, gear box, and bearing, an early optical telegraph
- Shen Kuo (1031–1095), China – improved gnomon, armillary sphere, clepsydra, and sighting tube
- Leonid Kupriyanovich (1929–1996), USSR/Russia – mobile phone
- Igor Kurchatov (1903–1960), USSR/Russia – Soviet atomic bomb, first nuclear power plant, first nuclear reactors for submarines and surface ships
- Thomas E. Kurtz (1928–2024), together with John G. Kemeny (1926–1992), U.S./Hungary – BASIC (programming language)
- Raymond Kurzweil (born 1948), Optical character recognition; flatbed scanner
- Ken Kutaragi (born 1950), Japan – PlayStation
- Stephanie Kwolek (1923–2014), U.S. – Kevlar
- John Howard Kyan (1774–1850), Ireland – process of Kyanization used for wood preservation

=== L ===
- Dmitry Lachinov (1842–1902), Russia – mercury pump, economizer for electricity consumption, electrical insulation tester, optical dynamometer, photometer, electrolyser
- René Laennec (1781–1826), France – stethoscope
- Georges Lakhovsky (1869–1942), Russia/U.S. – multiple wave oscillator
- Simon S. Lam (born 1947) U.S. – Secure Sockets invented in 1991 for securing Internet applications (World Wide Web, email, etc.)
- Hedy Lamarr (1914–2000), Austria and U.S. – Spread spectrum radio
- Edwin H. Land (1909–1991), U.S. – Polaroid polarizing filters and the Land Camera
- Samuel P. Langley (1834–1906), U.S. – bolometer
- Irving Langmuir (1851–1957), U.S. – gas filled incandescent light bulb, hydrogen welding
- Norm Larsen (1923–1970), U.S. – WD-40
- Lewis Latimer (1848–1928), U.S. – improved carbon-filament light bulb
- Gustav de Laval (1845–1913), Sweden – invented the milk separator and the milking machine
- Semyon Lavochkin (1900–1960), Russia – La-series aircraft, first operational surface-to-air missile S-25 Berkut
- John Bennet Lawes (1814–1900), UK – superphosphate or chemical fertilizer
- Ernest Orlando Lawrence (1901–1958), U.S. – Cyclotron
- Nikolai Lebedenko, Russia – Tsar Tank, largest armored vehicle in history
- Sergei Lebedev (1874–1934), Russia – commercially viable synthetic rubber
- William Lee (1563–1614), UK – Stocking frame knitting machine
- Edward Leedskalnin (1887–1951), U.S. – construction techniques used to single-handedly lift massive coral blocks in the creation of his Coral Castle
- Antoni van Leeuwenhoek (1632–1723), The Netherlands – development of the microscope
- Jerome H. Lemelson (1923–1997), U.S. – inventions in the fields in which he patented make possible, wholly or in part, innovations like automated warehouses, industrial robots, cordless telephones, fax machines, videocassette recorders, camcorders, and the tape transport used in Sony's Walkman tape players.
- Jean-Joseph Etienne Lenoir (1822–1900), Belgium – internal combustion engine, motorboat
- Giacomo da Lentini (13th century), Italy – Sonnet
- R. G. LeTourneau (1888–1969), U.S. – electric wheel, motor scraper, mobile oil drilling platform, bulldozer, cable control unit for scrapers
- Rasmus Lerdorf (born 1968), Greenland/Canada – PHP (programming language)
- Willard Frank Libby (1908–1980), U.S. – radiocarbon dating
- Justus von Liebig (1803–1873), Germany – nitrogen-based fertilizer
- Edward Light (1747–1832), UK – harp lute
- Hon Lik (born 1951), China – electronic cigarette
- Otto Lilienthal (1848–1896), Germany – hang glider
- Lin Yutang (1895–1976), China/U.S. – Chinese language typewriter
- Charles Lindbergh (1902–1974), U.S. – organ perfusion pump
- Frans Wilhelm Lindqvist (1862–1931), Sweden – Kerosene stove operated by compressed air
- Carl Linnaeus (1707–1778), Sweden – formal Binomial nomenclature for living organisms, Horologium Florae
- Hans Lippershey (1570–1619), The Netherlands – associated with the appearance of the telescope
- Jonas Ferdinand Gabriel Lippmann (1845–1921), France – Lippmann plate, Integral imaging, Lippmann electrometer
- Lisitsyn brothers, Ivan Fyodorovich and Nazar Fyodorovich, Russia – samovar (the first documented makers)
- William Howard Livens (1889–1964), UK – chemical warfare – Livens Projector
- Eduard Locher (1840–1910), Switzerland – Locher rack railway system
- Fredrik Ljungström (1875–1964) and Birger Ljungström (1872–1948), Sweden – Ljungström turbine, Ljungström air preheater, Ljungström method
- Alexander Lodygin (1847–1923), Russia – electrical filament, incandescent light bulb with tungsten filament
- Louis Lombard-Gérin (1848–1918), France – trolleybus
- Mikhail Lomonosov (1711–1765), Russia – night vision telescope, off-axis reflecting telescope, coaxial rotor, re-invented smalt
- Yury Lomonosov (1876–1952), Russia/UK – first successful mainline diesel locomotive
- Aleksandr Loran (1849 – after 1911), Russia – fire fighting foam, foam extinguisher
- Oleg Losev (1903–1942), Russia – light-emitting diode (LED), crystadine
- Antoine Louis (1723–1792), France – Guillotine
- Archibald Low (1882–1956), UK – pioneer of radio guidance systems
- Ed Lowe (1920–1995), U.S. – Cat litter
- Gleb Lozino-Lozinskiy (1909–2001), Russia – Buran (spacecraft), Spiral project
- Ignacy Łukasiewicz (1822–1882), Poland/Armenia – Kerosene lamp, Oil refinery
- Auguste and Louis Lumière (1862–1954 and 1864–1948), France – Cinématographe
- Cai Lun, 蔡倫 (50–121), China – paper
- Giovanni Luppis or Ivan Vukić (1813–1875), Austrian Empire (ethnical Croatian, from Rijeka) – self-propelled torpedo
- Gustave Lyon (1857–1936), France – chromatic harp
- Richard F. Lyon (born 1952), U.S. – Optical mouse
- Arkhip Lyulka (1908–1984), Russia – first double jet turbofan engine, other Soviet aircraft engines

=== M ===
- Charles Macintosh (1766–1843), Scotland – waterproof raincoat, life vest
- Theodore Maiman (1927–2007), U.S. – Laser, see also Gordon Gould
- Ahmed Majan (born 1963), UAE – instrumented racehorse saddle and others
- Aleksandr Makarov (born 1966), Russia/Germany – Orbitrap mass spectrometer
- Stepan Makarov (1849–1904), Russia – Icebreaker Yermak, first true icebreaker able to ride over and crush pack ice
- Victor Makeev (1924–1985), Russia – first submarine-launched ballistic missile
- Nestor Makhno (1888–1934), Ukraine/Russia – tachanka
- Dmitri Dmitrievich Maksutov (1896–1964), Russia – Maksutov telescope
- Annie Malone (1869–1957), U.S. – Cosmetics for African American women
- Sergey Malyutin (1859–1937), Russia – designed the first matryoshka doll (together with Vasily Zvyozdochkin)
- Boris Mamyrin (1919–2007), Russia – reflectron (ion mirror)
- George William Manby (1765–1854), UK – Fire extinguisher
- Harry Mendell, U.S. – invented the first digital sampling synthesizer
- Joy Mangano (born 1956), U.S. – household appliances
- Anna Mangin (1844–1931) – American inventor, educator, caterer and women's rights campaigner
- Charles Mantoux (1877–1947), France – Mantoux test (tuberculosis)
- Guglielmo Marconi (1874–1937), Italy – radio telegraphy
- Gheorghe Marinescu (1863–1938), Romania – first science films in the world in the neurology clinic in Bucharest (1898–1901)
- Sylvester Marsh (1803–1884), U.S. – Marsh rack railway system
- Konosuke Matsushita (1894–1989), Japan – battery-powered Bicycle lighting
- Taqi al-Din Muhammad ibn Ma'ruf (1526–1585), Syria/Egypt/Turkey – steam turbine, six-cylinder 'Monobloc' suction pump, framed sextant
- Alex Mashinsky (born 1965), U.S. – VoIP
- John Landis Mason (1826–1902), U.S. – Mason jars
- Fujio Masuoka (born 1943), Japan – Flash memory
- John W. Mauchly (1907–1980), U.S. – ENIAC – the first general purpose programmable digital computer
- Henry Maudslay (1771–1831), UK – screw-cutting lathe, bench micrometer
- Hiram Maxim (1840–1916), U.S. born, UK – first self-powered machine gun
- James Clerk Maxwell (1831–1879) and Thomas Sutton, Scotland – color photography
- Stanley Mazor (born 1941), U.S. – microprocessor
- John Loudon McAdam (1756–1836), Scotland – improved "macadam" road surface
- Elijah McCoy (1843–1929), Canada – Displacement lubricator
- Nicholas McKay Sr. (1920–2014), U.S. – Lint roller
- Frederick McKinley Jones (1893–1961), U.S. – 22 patents, the most prominent for an automatic refrigeration system for long-haul trucks
- James McLurkin (born 1972), U.S. – Ant robotics (robotics)
- Ilya Ilyich Mechnikov (1845–1916), Russia – probiotics
- Hippolyte Mège-Mouriès (1817–1880), France – margarine
- Mordecai Meirowitz (born 1930), Romania / Israel – Mastermind (board game)
- Cyrus Melikian (1920–2008), Armenia/U.S. – Coffee vending machine
- Dmitri Mendeleev (1834–1907), Russia – Periodic table, pycnometer, pyrocollodion
- Richard B. Merrill (1949–2008), U.S. – Foveon X3 sensor
- George de Mestral (1907–1990), Switzerland – Velcro
- Robert Metcalfe (born 1946), U.S. – Ethernet
- Antonio Meucci (1808–1889), Italy/U.S. – various early telephones, a hygrometer, a milk test
- Édouard Michelin (1859–1940), France – pneumatic tire
- Anthony Michell (1870–1959), Australia – tilting pad thrust bearing, crankless engine
- Artem Mikoyan (1905–1970), Armenia/Russia/USSR – MiG-series fighter aircraft, including world's most produced jet aircraft MiG-15 and most produced supersonic aircraft MiG-21 (together with Mikhail Gurevich)
- Alexander Mikulin (1895–1985), Russia – Mikulin AM-34 and other Soviet aircraft engines, co-developer of the Tsar Tank
- Mikhail Mil (1909–1970), Russia – Mi-series helicopter aircraft, including Mil Mi-8 (the world's most-produced helicopter) and Mil Mi-12 (the world's largest helicopter)
- Alexander Miles (1838–1918), U.S. – system for automatically opening and closing elevator doors
- David L. Mills (1938–2024), U.S. – Fuzzball router, Network Time Protocol
- Marvin Minsky (1927–2016), U.S. – Confocal microscopy
- Tokushichi Mishima (1893–1975), Japan – MKM magnetic steel
- Pavel Molchanov (1893–1941), Russia – Radiosonde
- Jules Montenier (1895–1962), U.S. – Anti-perspirant deodorant
- Montgolfier brothers (1740–1810) and (1745–1799), France – hot air balloon
- John J. Montgomery (1858–1911), U.S. – heavier-than-air gliders
- Narcis Monturiol i Estarriol (1819–1885), Spain – steam powered submarine
- Robert Moog (1934–2005), U.S. – Moog synthesizer
- John J. Mooney (1930–2020), together with Carl D. Keith (1920–2008), U.S. – three way catalytic converter
- Roland Moreno (1945–2012), France – inventor of the smart card
- Samuel Morey (1762–1843), U.S. – internal combustion engine
- Garrett A. Morgan (1877–1963), U.S. – inventor of the smoke hood
- Alexander Morozov (1904–1979), Russia – T-54/55 (the most produced tank in history), co-developer of T-34
- Walter Frederick Morrison (1920–2010), U.S. – Flying disc
- William Morrison (dentist) (1860–1926), U.S. – Cotton candy machine
- Samuel Morse (1791–1872), U.S. – early Morse code, see also Morse Code controversy
- Sergei Ivanovich Mosin (1849–1902), Russia – Mosin–Nagant rifle
- Motorins, Ivan Feodorovich (1660s–1735) and his son Mikhail Ivanovich (?–1750), Russia – Tsar Bell
- Vera Mukhina (1889–1953), Russia – welded sculpture
- Kary Mullis (1944–2019), U.S. – PCR
- Fe del Mundo (1911–2011), Philippines – medical incubator made out of bamboo for use in rural communities without electrical power
- Colin Murdoch (1929–2008), New Zealand – Tranquillizer gun, disposable hypodermic syringe
- William Murdoch (1754–1839), Scotland – Gas lighting
- Jozef Murgas (1864–1929), Slovakia – inventor of the wireless telegraph (forerunner of the radio)
- Evgeny Murzin (1914–1970), Russia – ANS synthesizer
- Banū Mūsā brothers, Muhammad (c. 800–873), Ahmad (803–873), Al-Hasan (810–873), Iraq – mechanical trick devices, hurricane lamp, self-trimming and self-feeding lamp, gas mask, clamshell grab, fail-safe system, mechanical musical instrument, automatic flute player
- Pieter van Musschenbroek (1692–1761), Netherlands – Leyden jar, pyrometer
- Walton Musser (1909–1998), U.S. – Harmonic drive gear
- Eadweard Muybridge (1830–1904), UK – motion picture
- Ted Myerson (born 1975), U.S. – data cloud computing system patents

=== N ===
- Georgi Nadjakov (1896–1981), Bulgaria – wikt:photoelectret
- Alexander Nadiradze (1914–1987), Georgia/Russia – first mobile ICBM (RT-21 Temp 2S), first reliable mobile ICBM (RT-2PM Topol)
- Nagai Nagayoshi (1844–1929), Japan – Methamphetamine
- James Naismith (1861–1939), Canadian born, U.S. – invented basketball and American football helmet
- Yoshiro Nakamatsu (born 1928), Japan – "PyonPyon" spring shoes, digital watch, CinemaScope, armchair "Cerebrex", sauce pump, taxicab meter
- Shuji Nakamura (born 1954), Japan – Blue laser
- John Napier (1550–1617), Scotland – logarithms
- Andrey Nartov (1683–1756), Russia – first lathe with a mechanic cutting tool-supporting carriage and a set of gears, fast-fire battery on a rotating disc, screw mechanism for changing the artillery fire angle, gauge–boring lathe for cannon-making, early telescopic sight
- James Nasmyth (1808–1890), Scotland – steam hammer
- Giulio Natta (1903–1979), together with Karl Ziegler (1898–1973), Italy/Germany – Ziegler–Natta catalyst
- William Neade (fl.1624–1637), England – weapon combining a longbow and a pike
- Erwin Neher (born 1944), together with Bert Sakmann (1942–), Germany – Patch clamp technique
- Ted Nelson (born 1937), U.S. – Hypertext, Hypermedia
- Sergey Nepobedimiy (1921–2014), Russia – first supersonic anti-tank guided missile Sturm, other Soviet rocket weaponry
- Karl Nessler (1872–1951), Germany/U.S. – Permanent wave machine, artificial eyebrows
- Bernard de Neumann (1943–2018), UK – massively parallel self-configuring multi-processor
- John von Neumann (1903–1957), Hungary – Von Neumann computer architecture, Stochastic computing, Merge sort algorithm
- Isaac Newton (1642–1727), UK – reflecting telescope (which reduces chromatic aberration) and double-reflecting quadrant
- Miguel Nicolelis (born 1961), Brazil – Brain-machine interfaces
- Joseph Nicephore Niépce (1765–1833), France – photography
- Nikolai Nikitin (1907–1973), Russia – prestressed concrete with wire ropes structure (Ostankino Tower), Nikitin-Travush 4000 project (precursor to X-Seed 4000)
- Paul Gottlieb Nipkow (1860–1940), Germany – Nipkow disk
- Jun-ichi Nishizawa (1926–2018), Japan – Optical communication system, SIT/SITh (Static Induction Transistor/Thyristor), Laser diode, PIN diode
- Alfred Nobel (1833–1896), Sweden – dynamite
- Ludvig Nobel (1831–1888), Sweden/Russia – first successful oil tanker
- Emmy Noether (1882–1935), Germany, groundbreaking contributions to abstract algebra and theoretical physics; Noether's Theorem
- Jean-Antoine Nollet (1700–1770), France – Electroscope
- Wilhelm Normann (1870–1939), Germany – Hydrogenation of fats
- Carl Richard Nyberg (1858–1939), Sweden – the blowtorch

=== O ===
- Aaron D. O'Connell (born 1981), U.S. – first Quantum machine
- Joseph John O'Connell (1861–1959), U.S. – number of inventions relating to telephony and electrical engineering
- Theophil Wilgodt Odhner (1845–1903), Sweden/Russia – the Odhner Arithmometer, a mechanical calculator
- Paul Offit (born 1951), U.S., along with Fred Clark and Stanley Plotkin, invented a pentavalent Rotavirus vaccine
- Hans von Ohain (1911–1998), Germany – co-inventor of the jet engine
- Jarkko Oikarinen (born 1967), Finland – Internet Relay Chat (IRC)
- Katsuhiko Okamoto (?–), Japan – Okamoto Cubes = modifications of Rubik's Cube
- Ransom Eli Olds (1864–1950), U.S. – Assembly line
- Lucien Olivier (1838–1883), Belgium or France / Russia – Russian salad (Olivier salad)
- Gerard K. O'Neill (1927–1992), U.S. – Storage ring (physics)
- J. Robert Oppenheimer (1904–1967), United States – Atomic bomb
- Hugh Orr (1715–1798), U.S. – machine for cleaning flax seed
- Hans Christian Ørsted (1777–1851), Denmark – electromagnetism, aluminium
- Elisha Otis (1811–1861), U.S. – safety system for elevators
- William Oughtred (1575–1660), UK – slide rule

=== P ===
- Arogyaswami Paulraj (born 1944), India/U.S. – MIMO
- Antonio Pacinotti (1841–1912), Italy – Pacinotti dynamo
- Hilary Page (1904–1957), UK – Self-Locking Building Bricks, the predecessor of Lego
- Larry Page (born 1973), U.S. – with Sergey Brin invented Google web search engine
- William Painter (1838–1906), UK/U.S. – Crown cork, Bottle opener
- Salvatore Pais (born 1967), Romania/U.S. – electromagnetic field generator to deflect asteroids away from the Earth, an inertial mass reduction device, a room-temperature superconductor, a gravitational wave generator, and a compact fusion reactor
- Alexey Pajitnov (born 1956), Russia/U.S. – Tetris
- Julio Palmaz (born 1945), Argentina – balloon-expandable, stent
- Helge Palmcrantz (1842–1880), Sweden – multi-barrel, lever-actuated, machine gun
- Daniel David Palmer (1845–1913), Canada – chiropractic
- Luigi Palmieri (1807–1896), Italy – seismometer
- Frank Pantridge (1916–2004), Ireland – Portable defibrillator
- Georgios Papanikolaou (1883–1962), Greece / U.S. – Papanicolaou stain, Pap test = Pap smear
- Alice H. Parker (1895–1920), U.S. – central heating using natural gas furnace
- Philip M. Parker (born 1960), U.S. – computer automated book authoring
- Thomas Parker (1843–1915), England – electric car
- Alexander Parkes (1831–1890), UK – celluloid
- Florence Parpart (c. 1856–?), U.S. – industrial sweeping machine, electrical refrigerator
- Forrest Parry (1921–2005), U.S. – Magnetic stripe card
- Charles Algernon Parsons (1854–1931), British – steam turbine
- Spede Pasanen (1930–2001), Finland – ski jumping sling, boat ski
- Blaise Pascal (1623–1662), France – Pascal's calculator
- Gustaf Erik Pasch (1788–1862), Sweden – safety match
- Dimitar Paskov (1914–1986), Bulgaria – Galantamine
- C. Kumar N. Patel (born 1938), India/U.S. – Carbon dioxide laser
- Les Paul (1915–2009), U.S. – multitrack recording
- Andreas Pavel (born 1945), Brazil – audio devices
- Ivan Pavlov (1849–1936), Russia, – classical conditioning
- Floyd Paxton (1918–1975), U.S. – Bread clip
- John Pemberton (1831–1888), U.S. – Coca-Cola
- Slavoljub Eduard Penkala (1871–1922), Croatia – mechanical pencil
- Ralph Peo (1897–1966), U.S. – early Automobile air conditioning, shock absorbers
- William Henry Perkin (1838–1907), UK – first synthetic organic chemical dye Mauveine
- Henry Perky (1843–1906), U.S. – shredded wheat
- Alfred Perot (1863–1925), together with Charles Fabry (1867–1945), France – Fabry–Pérot interferometer (physics)
- Stephen Perry, UK (fl. 19th century) – rubber band
- Aurel Persu (1890–1977), Romania – first aerodynamic car, aluminum body with wheels included under the body, 1922
- Vladimir Petlyakov (1891–1942), Russia – heavy bomber
- Julius Richard Petri (1852–1921), Germany – Petri dish
- Peter Petroff (1919–2003), Bulgaria – digital wrist watch, heart monitor, weather instruments
- Fritz Pfleumer (1881–1945), Germany – magnetic tape
- Auguste Piccard (1884–1962), Switzerland – Bathyscaphe
- Gregory Goodwin Pincus (1903–1967), together with Min Chueh Chang (1908–1991), U.S./China – Combined oral contraceptive pill
- Nikolay Ivanovich Pirogov (1810–1881), Russia – early use of ether as anaesthetic, first anaesthesia in a field operation, various kinds of surgical operations
- Fyodor Pirotsky (1845–1898), Russia – electric tram
- Arthur Pitney (1871–1933), U.S. – postage meter
- Hippolyte Pixii (1808–1835), France – Pixii dynamo
- Joseph Plateau (1801–1883), Belgium – phenakistiscope (stroboscope)
- Baltzar von Platen (1898–1984), Sweden – gas absorption refrigerator
- James Leonard Plimpton (1828–1911), U.S. – roller skates
- Ivan Plotnikov (1902–1995), Russia – kirza leather
- Roy Plunkett (1910–1994), U.S. – Teflon
- Petrache Poenaru (1799–1875), Romania – fountain pen
- Christopher Polhem (1661–1751), Sweden – Padlock
- Nikolai Polikarpov (1892–1944), Russia – Po-series aircraft, including Polikarpov Po-2 Kukuruznik (world's most produced biplane)
- Eugene Polley (1915–2012), U.S. – wireless remote control (with Robert Adler)
- Ivan Polzunov (1728–1766), Russia – first two-cylinder steam engine
- Mikhail Pomortsev (1851–1916), Russia – nephoscope
- Olivia Poole (1889–1975), U.S. – Jolly Jumper baby harness
- Alexander Popov (1859–1906), Russia – radio pioneer, created a radio receiver that worked as a lightning detector
- Nikolay Popov (1931–2008), Russia – first fully gas turbine main battle tank (T-80)
- Josef Popper (1838–1921), Austria – discovered the transmission of power by electricity.
- Aleksandr Porokhovschikov (1892–1941), Russia – Vezdekhod (the first prototype tank, or tankette, and the first caterpillar amphibious ATV)
- Ignazio Porro (1801–1875), Italy – Porro prism, strip camera
- Valdemar Poulsen (1869–1942), Denmark – magnetic wire recorder, arc converter
- Joseph Priestley (1733–1804), UK – soda water
- Robert Taylor Pritchett (1828–1907), UK – Pritchett bullet
- Alexander Procofieff de Seversky (1894–1974), Russia/U.S. – first gyroscopically stabilized bombsight, ionocraft, also developed air-to-air refueling
- Alexander Prokhorov (1916–2002), Russia – co-inventor of laser and maser
- Petro Prokopovych (1775–1850), Russian Empire – early beehive frame, queen excluder and other beekeeping novelties
- Sergey Prokudin-Gorsky (1863–1944), Russia/France – early colour photography method based on three colour channels, also colour film slides and colour motion pictures
- Mark Publicover (born 1958), U.S. – first affordable trampoline safety net enclosure
- George Pullman (1831–1897), U.S. – Pullman sleep wagon
- Ivan Puluj (1845–1918), Russia/Ukraine – X-rays
- Michael I. Pupin (1858–1935), Serbia – pupinization (loading coils), tunable oscillator
- Tivadar Puskás (1844–1893), Hungary – telephone exchange

=== Q ===
- Calvin Quate (1923–2019), with Gerd Binnig (born 1947), and with Christoph Gerber (1942–), U.S./Germany/Switzerland – Atomic force microscope
- Adolphe Quetelet (1796–1874), France/Belgium – Body mass index (BMI)

=== R ===
- Jacob Rabinow (1910–1999), U.S. – Magnetic particle clutch, various Phonograph-related patents
- John Goffe Rand (1801–1873), U.S. – Tube (container)
- Robert Ransome (1753–1830), England – improvement to the plough
- Muhammad ibn Zakarīya Rāzi (Rhazes) (865–965), Persia/Iran – distillation and extraction methods, hydrochloric acid, soap kerosene, kerosene lamp, chemotherapy, sodium hydroxide
- Alec Reeves (1902–1971), UK – Pulse-code modulation
- Karl von Reichenbach (1788–1869), Germany – paraffin, creosote oil, phenol
- Tadeus Reichstein (1897–1996), Poland/Switzerland – Reichstein process (industrial vitamin C synthesis)
- Ira Remsen (1846–1927), U.S. – saccharin
- Ralf Reski (born 1958), Germany – Moss bioreactor 1998
- Josef Ressel (1793–1857), Czechoslovakia – ship propeller
- William Reynolds (1758–1803), England – canal inclined plane
- Ri Sung-gi (1905–1996), North Korea – Vinylon
- Charles Francis Richter (1900–1985), U.S. – Richter magnitude scale
- Adolph Rickenbacker (1886–1976), Switzerland – Electric guitar
- Hyman George Rickover (1900–1986), U.S. – Nuclear submarine
- Niklaus Riggenbach (1817–1899), Switzerland – Riggenbach rack railway system, Counter-pressure brake
- Dennis Ritchie (1941–2011), U.S. – C (programming language)
- Gilles de Roberval (1602–1675), France – Roberval balance
- John Roebuck (1718–1794) UK – lead chamber process for sulfuric acid synthesis
- Francis Rogallo (1912–2009), U.S. – Rogallo wing
- Heinrich Rohrer (1933–2013), together with Gerd Binnig (1947–), Switzerland/Germany – Scanning tunneling microscope
- Peter I the Great (Pyotr Alexeyevich Romanov), Tsar and Emperor of Russia (1672–1725), Russia – decimal currency, yacht club, sounding line with separating plummet (sounding weight probe)
- Wilhelm Conrad Röntgen (1845–1923), Germany – the X-ray machine
- Ida Rosenthal (1886–1973), Belarus/Russia/U.S. – Bra (Maidenform), the standard of cup sizes, nursing bra, full-figured bra, the first seamed uplift bra (all with her husband William)
- Sidney Rosenthal (1907–1979), U.S. – Magic Marker
- Eugene Roshal (born 1972), Russia – FAR file manager, RAR file format, WinRAR file archiver
- Boris Rosing (1869–1933), Russia – CRT television (first television system using cathode-ray tube on the receiving side)
- Guido van Rossum (born 1956), The Netherlands – Python (programming language)
- Michael Rothman, U.S. – UEFI
- Subrata Roy (scientist) (born 1962), India, U.S. – Wingless Electromagnetic Air Vehicle, Serpentine geometry plasma actuator, micro-scale actuators
- Jean-François Pilâtre de Rozier (1754–1785), France – Rozière balloon
- Ernő Rubik (born 1944), Hungary – Rubik's Cube, Rubik's Magic and Rubik's Clock
- Kay LeRoy Ruggles (1932–2012), U.S. – inventor and designer known for UMBO shelving and furniture
- Ernst Ruska (1906–1988), Germany – electron microscope
- William Chester Ruth (1882–1971), U.S. – combination baler feeder, self-lifting farm elevator
- François van Rysselberghe (1846–1893), Belgium – Universal meteorograph, Condenser telephone
- Stockton Rush (1962–2023), U.S. – co-founder and chief executive officer of OceanGate

=== S ===
- Albert Bruce Sabin (1906–1993), U.S. – oral Polio vaccine
- Alexander Sablukov (1783–1857), Russia – centrifugal fan
- Şerafeddin Sabuncuoğlu (1385–1468), Turkey – illustrated surgical atlas
- Andrei Sakharov (1921–1989), Russia – invented explosively pumped flux compression generator, co-developed the Tsar Bomba and tokamak
- Jonas Edward Salk (1914–1995), U.S. – injection Polio vaccine
- Robert Salmon (1763–1821), England – agricultural implements
- Franz San Galli (1824–1908), Poland/Russia (Italian and German descent) – radiator, central heating
- Frederick Sanger (1918–2013), U.S. – Sanger sequencing (= DNA sequencing)
- Yoshiyuki Sankai (born c. 1957), Japan – Robotic exoskeleton for motion support (medicine)
- Alberto Santos-Dumont (1873–1932), Brazil – non-rigid airship and airplane
- Arthur William Savage (1857–1938) – radial tires, gun magazines, Savage Model 99 lever action rifle
- Thomas Savery (1650–1715), UK – steam engine
- Adolphe Sax (1814–1894), Belgium – saxophone
- Vincent Joseph Schaefer (1906–1993), U.S. – Cloud seeding by dry ice
- Bela Schick (1877–1967), Hungary – diphtheria test
- Wilhelm Schickard (1592–1635), Germany – mechanical calculator
- Hugo Schiff (1834–1915), Germany – Schiff test (histology)
- Pavel Schilling (1786–1837), Estonia/Russia – first electromagnetic telegraph, mine with an electric fuse
- Gilmore Schjeldahl (1912–2002), U.S. – Airsickness bag
- Hubert Schlafly (1919–2011), U.S. – Teleprompter = Autocue
- Wilhelm Schlenk (1879–1943), Germany – Schlenk flask (chemistry)
- Bernhard Schmidt (1879–1935), Estonia/Germany – Schmidt camera
- Friedrich Schmiedl (1902–1994), Austria – rocket mail
- Otto Schmitt (1913–1998), U.S. – Schmitt trigger (electronics)
- Christian Schnabel (1878–1936), German – simplistic food cutleries
- Kees A. Schouhamer Immink (born 1946), Netherlands – Major contributor to development of compact disc
- August Schrader (1807–1894), U.S. – Schrader valve for Pneumatic tire
- David Schwarz (1852–1897), Croatia, – rigid airship, later called Zeppelin
- Raymond Scott (1908–1994), U.S. – inventor and developer of electronic music technology
- Girolamo Segato (1792–1836), Italy – artificial petrifaction of human cadavers
- Marc Seguin (1786–1875), France – wire-cable suspension bridge
- Hanaoka Seishū (1760–1835), Japan – General anaesthetic
- Sejong the Great (1397–1450), South Korea (Joseon dynasty) – Hangul (Native alphabet of the Korean language)
- Ted Selker (inv. 1987), U.S. – Pointing stick
- Léon Serpollet (1858–1907), France – Flash boiler, Gardner-Serpollet steam car
- Iwan Serrurier (1878–1953), Netherlands/U.S. – inventor of the Moviola for film editing
- Mark Serrurier (1904–1988), U.S. – Serrurier truss for Optical telescopes
- Gerhard Sessler (born 1931), Germany – foil electret microphone, silicon microphone
- Guy Severin (1926–2008), Russia – extra-vehicular activity supporting system
- Ed Seymour (inv. c. 1949), U.S. – Aerosol paint
- Leonty Shamshurenkov (1687–1758), Russia – first self-propelling carriage (a precursor to both bicycle and automobile), projects of an original odometer and self-propelling sledge
- Ibn al-Shatir (1304–1375), Syria – "jewel box" device which combined a compass with a universal sundial
- Bi Sheng (Chinese: 畢昇) (c. 990–1051), China – clay movable type printing
- Patsy O’Connell Sherman (1930–2008), U.S. – Scotchgard
- Murasaki Shikibu (c. 973–1025), Japan – psychological novel
- Pyotr Shilovsky (1871–1957), Russia/UK – gyrocar
- Masatoshi Shima (born 1943), Japan – microprocessor
- Fathullah Shirazi (c. 1582), Mughal India – early volley gun
- Joseph Shivers (1920–2014), U.S. – Spandex
- William Bradford Shockley (1910–1989), U.S. – co-inventor of transistor
- Henry Shrapnel (1761–1842), UK – Shrapnel shell ammunition
- Vladimir Shukhov (1853–1939), Russia – thermal cracking (Shukhov cracking process), thin-shell structure, tensile structure, hyperboloid structure, gridshell, oil pipeline, cylindric oil depot
- Sheikh Muszaphar Shukor (born 1972), Malaysia – cell growth in outer space, crystallization of proteins and microbes in space
- Augustus Siebe (1788–1872), Germany/UK – Inventor of the standard diving dress
- Sir William Siemens (1823–1883), Germany – regenerative furnace
- Werner von Siemens (1816–1892), Germany – electric elevator, Electromote (= first trolleybus), an early Dynamo
- Igor Sikorsky (1889–1972), Russia/U.S. – first four-engine fixed-wing aircraft (Russky Vityaz), first airliner and purpose-designed bomber (Ilya Muromets), helicopter, Sikorsky-series helicopters
- Bernard Silver (1924–1963), together with Norman Joseph Woodland (1921–2012), U.S. – Barcode
- Kia Silverbrook (born 1958), Australia – Memjet printer, world's most prolific inventor
- Luther Simjian (1905–1997), Armenia/U.S. – Automated teller machine (ATM)
- Vladimir Simonov (1935–2020), Russia – APS Underwater Assault Rifle, SPP-1 underwater pistol
- Charles Simonyi (born 1948), Hungary – Hungarian notation
- Ibn Sina (Avicenna) (980–1037), Persia/Iran – steam distillation, essential oil, pharmacopoeia, clinical pharmacology, clinical trial, randomized controlled trial, quarantine, cancer surgery, cancer therapy, pharmacotherapy, phytotherapy, Hindiba, Taxus baccata L, calcium channel blocker
- Clive Sinclair (1940–2021), U.K. – Sinclair C5, ZX Spectrum and A-bike
- Isaac Singer (1811–1875), U.S. – sewing machine
- B. F. Skinner (1904–1990), U.S. – Operant conditioning chamber
- Hannah Slater (1774–1812), U.S. – cotton-sewing thread
- Nikolay Slavyanov (1854–1897), Russia – shielded metal arc welding
- Alexander Smakula (1900–1983), Ukraine/Russia/U.S. – anti-reflective coating
- Michael Smith (1932–2000), U.S. – Site-directed mutagenesis (molecular biology)
- Oliver Smithies (1925–2017), together with Sir Martin John Evans (born 1941), and Mario Ramberg Capecchi (born 1937), U.S. – Knockout mouse, Gene targeting
- Yefim Smolin, Russia – table-glass (stakan granyonyi)
- Friedrich Soennecken (1848–1919), Germany – Ring binder, Hole punch
- Su Song (1020–1101), China – first chain drive
- Marin Soljačić (born 1974), Croatia – Resonant inductive coupling
- Edwin Southern (born 1938), U.S. – Southern blot (molecular biology)
- Alfred P. Southwick (1826–1898), U.S. – Electric chair
- Igor Spassky (1926–2024), Russia – Sea Launch platform
- Clara E. Speight-Humberston (1862–1936), Canada – card game
- Percy Spencer (1894–1970), U.S. – microwave oven
- Elmer Ambrose Sperry (1860–1930), U.S. – gyroscope-guided automatic pilot
- Lyman Spitzer (1914–1997), U.S. – Stellarator (physics)
- Frank J. Sprague (1857–1934), father of electric traction, electric elevator improvements and electric multiple unit trains.
- Richard Stallman (born 1953), U.S. – GNU operating system, GNU Emacs, GNU Compiler Collection
- Ladislas Starevich (1882–1965), Russia/France – puppet animation, live-action/animated film
- Gary Starkweather (1938–2019), U.S. – laser printer, color management
- John Kemp Starley (1855–1901), U.K. – safety bicycle
- Betsey Ann Stearns (1830–1914), U.S. – garment cutting diagram and system
- Boris Stechkin (1891–1969), Russia – co-developer of Sikorsky Ilya Muromets and Tsar Tank, developer of Soviet heat and aircraft engines
- George Stephenson (1781–1848), UK – steam railway
- Simon Stevin (1548–1620), Netherlands – land yacht
- Andreas Stihl (1896–1973), Switzerland/Germany – electric chain saw
- Reverend Dr Robert Stirling (1790–1878), Scotland – Stirling engine
- Aurel Stodola (1859–1942), Slovakia – gas turbines
- Aleksandr Stoletov (1839–1896), Russia – first solar cell based on the outer photoelectric effect
- Levi Strauss (1829–1902), U.S. – blue jeans
- John Stringfellow (1799–1883), UK – aerial steam carriage
- Bjarne Stroustrup (born 1950), Denmark – C++ (programming language)
- Almon Strowger (1839–1902), U.S. – automatic telephone exchange
- Emil Strub (1858–1909), Switzerland – Strub rack railway system
- Abd al-Rahman al-Sufi (Azophi) (903–986), Persia/Iran – timekeeping astrolabe, navigational astrolabe, surveying astrolabe
- René Núñez Suárez (born 1945/1946), El Salvador – "turbococina" (turbo-cooker)
- Kyota Sugimoto (1882–1972), Japan – Japanese language typewriter
- Mutsuo Sugiura (1918–1986), Japan – Esophagogastroduodenoscope
- Pavel Sukhoi (1895–1975), Russia – Su-series fighter aircraft
- Sushruta (600 BC), Vedic India – inventor of Plastic Surgery, Cataract Surgery, Rhinoplasty
- Theodor Svedberg (1884–1971), Sweden – Analytical ultracentrifuge
- Joseph Swan (1828–1914), UK – Incandescent light bulb
- Robert Swanson (1905–1994), Canada – invented and developed the first multi-chime air horn for use with diesel locomotives
- Andrei Sychra (c.1773/76–1850), Lithuania/Russia, Czech descent – Russian seven-string guitar
- Walter Sylvester (1867–1944), UK – the "Sylvester", for safely removing pit props
- Vladimir Syromyatnikov (1933–2006), Russia – Androgynous Peripheral Attach System and other spacecraft docking mechanisms
- Simon Sze (1936–2023), Taiwan/U.S., together with Dawon Kahng (1931–1992), South Korea – Floating-gate MOSFET
- Leó Szilárd (1898–1964), Hungary/U.S. – co-developed the atomic bomb, patented the nuclear reactor, catalyst of the Manhattan Project

=== T ===
- Gyula Takátsy (1914–1980), Hungary – first Microtiter plate
- Esther Takeuchi (born 1953) – holds more than 150 US-patents, the largest number for any woman in the United States
- Igor Tamm (1895–1971), Russia – co-developer of tokamak
- Ching W. Tang (born 1947), Hong Kong/U.S., together with Steven Van Slyke, U.S. – OLED
- Mardi bin Ali al-Tarsusi (c. 1187), Middle East – counterweight trebuchet, mangonel
- Gustav Tauschek (1899–1945), Austria – Drum memory
- Kenyon Taylor (1908–1986), U.S. – Flip-disc display
- Bernard Tellegen (1900–1990), Netherlands – pentode
- Edward Teller (1908–2003), Hungary – hydrogen bomb
- Eli Terry (1772–1852)
- Michel Ter-Pogossian (1925–1996), Armenia/U.S. – Positron emission tomography (PET)
- Nikola Tesla (1856–1943), Serbia – induction motor, high-voltage / high-frequency power experiments, the transmission of electrical power
- Avie Tevanian (born 1961), Armenia/U.S. – Mach kernel, NeXTSTEP, macOS
- Léon Theremin (1896–1993), Russia – theremin, interlace, burglar alarm, terpsitone, Rhythmicon (first drum machine), The Thing (listening device)
- Charles Xavier Thomas de Colmar (1785–1870), France – Arithmometer
- Valerie Thomas (born 1943), U.S. – illusion transmitter
- Elihu Thomson (1853–1937), UK, U.S. – Prolific inventor, Arc lamp and many others
- William Thomson, 1st Baron Kelvin (1824–1907), UK – Kelvin absolute temperature scale
- Eric Tigerstedt (1887–1925), Finland – Sound-on-film, triode vacuum tube
- Kálmán Tihanyi (1897–1947), Hungary – co-inventor of cathode-ray tube and iconoscope, infrared video camera, plasma display
- Mikhail Tikhonravov (1900–1974), Russia – co-developer of Sputnik 1 (the first artificial satellite) together with Korolyov and Keldysh, designer of further Sputniks
- Gavriil Adrianovich Tikhov (1875–1960), Russia – feathering spectrograph
- Benjamin Chew Tilghman (1821–1897), U.S. – sandblasting
- Fedor Tokarev (1871–1968), Russia – TT-33 semiautomatic handgun and SVT-40 self-loading rifle
- Ray Tomlinson (1941–2016), U.S. – First inter-computer email
- Evangelista Torricelli (1608–1647), Italy – barometer
- Linus Torvalds (born 1969), Finland/U.S. – Linux kernel
- Alfred Traeger (1895–1980), Australia – Pedal radio
- Lloyd Trammell (born 1953), U.S. – inventor in the field of dimensional sound processing
- Richard Trevithick (1771–1833), UK – high-pressure steam engine, first full-scale steam locomotive
- Hans Tropsch (1889–1935), together with Franz Joseph Emil Fischer (1877–1947), Germany – Fischer–Tropsch process (refinery process)
- Yuri Trutnev (1927–2021), Russia – co-developer of the Tsar Bomba
- Roger Y. Tsien (1952–2016), together with Osamu Shimomura (1928–2018) and Martin Chalfie (born 1947), U.S. – Discovery and development of Green fluorescent protein
- Konstantin Tsiolkovsky (1857–1935), Russia – spaceflight, Tsiolkovsky rocket equation
- Mikhail Tsvet (1872–1919), Russia – chromatography (specifically adsorption chromatography, the first chromatography method)
- Alexei Tupolev (1925–2001), Russia – the Tupolev Tu-144 (first supersonic passenger jet)
- Andrei Tupolev (1888–1972), Russia – turboprop powered long-range airliner (Tupolev Tu-114), turboprop strategic bomber (Tupolev Tu-95)
- Alan Turing (1912–1954), UK – Turing machine
- Nasīr al-Dīn al-Tūsī (1201–1274), Persia/Iran – observatory, Tusi-couple
- Sharaf al-Dīn al-Tūsī (1135–1213), Persia/Iran – linear astrolabe
- Ralph Hart Tweddell (1843–1895), England – portable hydraulic riveter

=== U ===
- Shintaro Uda (1869–1976), together with Hidetsugu Yagi (1886–1976), Japan – Yagi–Uda antenna–
- Lewis Urry (1927–2004), Canada – long-lasting alkaline battery
- Tomislav Uzelac, Croatia – first successful MP3 player, AMP

=== V ===
- Ira Van Gieson (1866–1913), U.S. – Van Gieson's stain (histology)
- Theophilus Van Kannel (1841–1919), U.S. – revolving door (1888)
- Vladimir Veksler (1907–1966), Russia – synchrophasotron, co-inventor of synchrotron
- John Venn (1834–1923), UK – Venn diagram (1881)
- Claude Hamilton Verity (1880–1949), United Kingdom – Veritiphone, synchronisation of sound and film
- Auguste Victor Louis Verneuil (1856–1913), France – Verneuil process (crystal growth)
- Pierre Vernier (1580–1637), France – Vernier scale (1631)
- Lucien Vidi (1805–1866), France – Barograph
- Edgar Villchur (1917–2011), U.S. – Acoustic suspension (loudspeaker)
- Artturi Ilmari Virtanen (1895–1973), Finland – AIV fodder
- Alessandro Volta (1745–1827), Italy – battery, see also Voltaic pile
- Bernard Vonnegut (1914–1997), together with Henry Chessin, and Richard E. Passarelli Jr., U.S. – Cloud seeding by silver iodide
- Ivan Vučetić (1858–1925), Croatia – method of fingerprint classification

=== W ===
- Ruth Graves Wakefield (1903–1977), U.S. – chocolate chip cookie
- Paul Walden (1863–1957), Latvia/Russia/Germany – Walden inversion, Ethylammonium nitrate (the first room temperature ionic liquid)
- Adam Walker (1730–1821), UK – eidouranion
- Madam C.J. Walker (1867–1919), U.S. – beauty and hair products for African American women
- Barnes Wallis (1887–1979), UK – bouncing bomb
- Frederick Walton (c. 1834–1928), UK – Linoleum
- Maurice Ward (1933–2011), UK – Starlite
- David Warren (1925–2010), Australia – Flight data recorder (FDR) and Cockpit voice recorder (CDR)
- Aldred Scott Warthin (1866–1931), together with Allen Chronister Starry (1890–1973), U.S. – Warthin–Starry stain (histology)
- Robert Watson-Watt (1892–1973), Scotland – microwave radar
- James Watt (1736–1819), Scotland – improved Steam engine
- Thomas Wedgwood (1771–1805), UK – first (not permanent) photograph
- Carl Auer von Welsbach (1858–1929), Austria – Gas mantle, ferrocerium
- Jonas Wenström (1855–1893), Sweden – three-phase electrical power
- George Westinghouse (1846–1914), U.S. – Air brake (rail)
- Charles Wheatstone (1802–1875), UK – concertina, stereoscope, microphone, Playfair cipher, pseudoscope, dynamo
- Richard T. Whitcomb (1921–2009), U.S. – Supercritical airfoil, Winglet
- Cornelius Whitehouse (1796–1883), UK – method of manufacturing tubes cheaply and accurately
- Eli Whitney (1765–1825), U.S. – cotton gin
- Frank Whittle (1907–1996), UK – co-inventor of the jet engine
- Otto Wichterle (1913–1989), Czechoslovakia – soft contact lens
- Norman Wilkinson (1878–1971), UK – Dazzle camouflage
- Charles Thomson Rees Wilson (1869–1959), UK – Cloud chamber
- Paul Winchell (1922–2005), U.S. – artificial heart
- Sergei Winogradsky (1856–1953), Russia / USSR – Winogradsky column for culturing microorganisms
- Niklaus Wirth (1934–2024), Switzerland – Pascal (programming language)
- A. Baldwin Wood (1879–1956), U.S. – high volume pump
- Norman Joseph Woodland (1921–2012), together with Bernard Silver (1924–1963), U.S. – Barcode
- Granville Woods (1856–1910), U.S. – Synchronous Multiplex Railway Telegraph
- Steve Wozniak (born 1950), U.S. – Apple I & II computers, early Macintosh concepts, CL 9 CORE universal remote and other devices and applications.
- James Homer Wright (1869–1928), U.S. – Wright's stain (histology)
- Wright brothers, Orville (1871–1948) and Wilbur (1867–1912), U.S. – powered airplane
- Wu Yulu, Chinese farmer and inventor of home-made robots
- J. Richard Wuest, developer of colored auxiliary labels.
- Adam Wybe (1584–1653), Dutch – inventor of the cable car on multiple supports
- Arthur Wynne (1871–1945), UK – creator of crossword puzzle

=== X ===
- Yi Xing (683–727), China – Astronomical clock

=== Y ===
- Pavel Yablochkov (1847–1894), Russia – Yablochkov candle (first commercially viable electric carbon arc lamp)
- Hidetsugu Yagi (1886–1976), together with Shintaro Uda (1896–1976), Japan – Yagi–Uda antenna
- Alexander Yakovlev (1906–1989), Russia – Yak-series aircraft, including Yakovlev Yak-40 (the first regional jet)
- Linus Yale Jr. (1821–1868), U.S. – cylinder lock
- Linus Yale Sr. (1797–1858), U.S. – pin tumbler lock
- Shunpei Yamazaki (born 1942), Japan – patents in computer science and solid-state physics, see List of prolific inventors
- Gazi Yaşargil (1925–2025), Turkey – Microneurosurgery
- Ryōichi Yazu (1878–1908), Japan – Yazu Arithmometer
- Gunpei Yokoi (1941–1997), Japan – Game Boy
- Arthur M. Young (1905–1995), U.S. – Bell Helicopter
- Vladimir Yourkevich (1885–1964), Russia/France/U.S. – ship hull design
- Tu Youyou (born 1930), China – Artemisinin
- Sergei Yudin (1891–1954), Russia – cadaveric blood transfusion and other medical operations
- Muhammad Yunus (born 1940), Bangladesh – microcredit, microfinance
- Abraham Albert Yuzpe (born 1938), U.S. – Yuzpe regimen (= form of Emergency contraception)

=== Z ===
- Abu al-Qasim al-Zahrawi (Abulcasis) (936–1013), Islamic Spain – catgut surgical suture, various surgical instruments and dental devices
- Frank Zamboni (1901–1988), U.S. – Ice resurfacer
- Giuseppe Zamboni (1776–1846), Italy – Zamboni pile (early battery)
- Ludwik Łazarz Zamenhof (1859–1917), Russia/Poland – Esperanto
- Walter Zapp (1905–2003), Latvia/Estonia/Germany – Minox (subminiature camera)
- Abū Ishāq Ibrāhīm al-Zarqālī (Arzachel) (1028–1087), Islamic Spain – almanac, equatorium, universal astrolabe
- Yevgeny Zavoisky (1907–1976), Russia – EPR spectroscopy, co-developer of NMR spectroscopy
- Nikolay Zelinsky (1861–1953), Russia – first effective filtering coal gas mask in the world
- Ferdinand von Zeppelin (1838–1917), Germany – Zeppelin
- Frits Zernike (1888–1966), The Netherlands – Phase contrast microscope
- Tang Zhongming (1897–1980), China – internal combustion engine powered by charcoal
- Jian Zhou (1957–1999), together with Ian Hector Frazer (born 1953), China/U.S. – HPV vaccine against cervical cancer
- Nikolai Zhukovsky (1847–1921), Russia – early wind tunnel, co-developer of the Tsar Tank
- Karl Ziegler (1898–1973), together with Giulio Natta (1903–1979), Germany/Italy – Ziegler–Natta catalyst
- Franz Ziehl (1857–1926), together with Friedrich Neelsen (1854–1898), Germany – Ziehl–Neelsen stain (histology)
- Konrad Zuse (1910–1995), Germany – invented the first programmable general-purpose computer (Z1, Z2, Z3, Z4)
- Vasily Zvyozdochkin (1876–1956), Russia – matryoshka doll (together with Sergey Malyutin)
- Vladimir Zworykin (1889–1982), Russia/U.S. – Iconoscope, kinescope, electronic television

== See also ==
- Creativity techniques
- List of emerging technologies
- List of prolific inventors
- Ten Japanese Great Inventors
- The heroic theory of invention and scientific development
- Timeline of historic inventions
- List of African-American inventors and scientists
