= Brislin =

Brislin may refer to:

- John Brislin (1838 – 1907), U.S. inventor
- John Harold Brislin, U.S. journalist
- Kevin Brislin (born 1942), Australian cyclist
- Stephen Brislin (born 1956), South African Catholic cardinal
- Tom Brislin (born 1973), U.S. musician and vocalist
