= Mamoru Imura =

Mamoru Imura (井村 守, Imura Mamoru; November 22, 1948 in Hyōgo, Japan) is a Japanese inventor, music composer, and Chief Executive Officer of Vita Craft Corporation and Vita Craft Japan who currently resides in Nishinomiya, Japan.

== Biography ==
Mamoru attended the Osaka University of Foreign Studies for roughly a year, but then dropped out. Shortly after he was accepted into the University of Tokyo, but the school was temporary shut down due to student protests, so he transferred to Trinity College, Oxford and then about a year later he transferred to Stanford University. In 1974 Mamoru established Imura & Co., LTD (VitaCraft Japan) and in 2002 Mamoru purchased Vita Craft Corporation. In 2007, he patented the RFIQin.
