= Vita Craft Corporation =

Vita Craft
- Company type: Private
- Industry: Cookware
- Founded: 1939; 87 years ago
- Headquarters: Shawnee, Kansas, U.S.
- Key people: Mamoru Imura, CEO
- Number of employees: 100
- Parent: Imura International USA Inc.
- Website: www.VitaCraft.com

Vita Craft Corporation is a manufacturer of multi-ply stainless steel cookware and other cookware products. The cookware is manufactured and sold in the United States, but the majority of sales are from the Asian and European markets. Japan alone accounts for about 80% of Vita Craft's revenue. In Asia and Europe, Vita Craft is sold in department stores. In the United States, Vita Craft is sold door-to-door, at food-related events and conventions using a direct selling model. Imura International USA Inc. is the parent company of Vita.

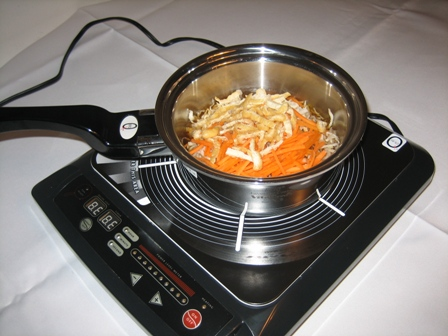
Vita Craft cookware

== History and focus ==
The company was founded in 1939 after research and development by two cookware specialists from Seattle University and University of Wisconsin. The company was purchased in 2002 by the owner of their Japanese distributor, Mamoru Imura, and Imura International USA became Vita's parent company.

Vita Craft's cookware is stainless steel with an aluminum core. The "vapor seal" lids are designed to prevent heat and moisture from escaping when the lid is secured, which results in "waterless" cooking. According to the company, waterless cooking requires less heat and less pressure, while more vitamins and minerals are retained in the food. In addition, some pans are manufactured with multiple layers of metal to distribute heat more evenly in cooking.

In 1966, Vita Craft Corporation wanted to expand their facilities to the land that housed a jail built in 1843. As a result, a group of citizens formed the Shawnee Historical Society and moved the jail to Shawnee Town, where it stands today.

== Lawsuit ==
In November 2017 Imura International USA Inc, the parent company of Vita, filed a lawsuit accusing Circuitlab Inc of infringing on its patents for cookware that can communicate with the stove it is cooking on to control the temperature automatically. Imura says it holds four patents for this technology.

== Bankruptcy ==
On November 1, 2019, Vita Craft Corp. filed for Chapter 11 bankruptcy, listing assets up to $7,843,679 and debts up to $2,698,042. 2018 revenue was stated to be $3.34 million, which was a decrease of 36% from 2017 revenue of $5.21 million.

== See also ==
- RFIQin, an automatic induction cooking system.
