= Michael D. Ercolino =

Michael Dominic Ercolino (May 17, 1906 – November 13, 1982) was an inventor and businessman. His parents were Carmine Antonio Fortunato Ercolino (February 8, 1882 - July 11, 1952) and Angelina Maria Pascale (1886 - July 6, 1930). Michael married Julia K. Florio (December 25, 1910 - June 1, 2005) on August 2, 1933 in Manhattan, New York City. They had 3 children, Angelina Ercolino (b. 1935), Carmine Charles Ercolino (b. May 1939) and Toni Ann Ercolino (b. April 1946).

Michael invented a homing device used by the United States in the D-Day Invasion and in West Africa during World War II. This device made it possible for paratroopers who landed behind enemy line to reorganize into homogeneous fighting units. Michael also invented the Conical V Beam TV Antenna, which was sold throughout the United States in the early 1940s, and which was responsible for making TV reception possible throughout the U.S. He founded Telrex Communications Engineering Laboratories, Inc. (located in Neptune Township, Monmouth County, New Jersey), which manufactured a line of communication antennas, heavy duty rotators, and heavy duty rotatable mono poles which were capable of holding a number of high frequency communication antennas used on the dew line in northern Canada, and sold throughout the world. Telrex communication systems were so cherished for their performance and durability, that a Telrex antenna system installed on the US Embassy in Saigon, Vietnam was removed after the US pulled out and reinstalled in Cambodia. Later the system was returned to the United States, and was installed in Washington DC.

Michael D. Ercolino and his wife Julia are both buried in Mount Calvary Cemetery (Neptune Township, Monmouth County, New Jersey).
