= Kay LeRoy Ruggles =

American inventor

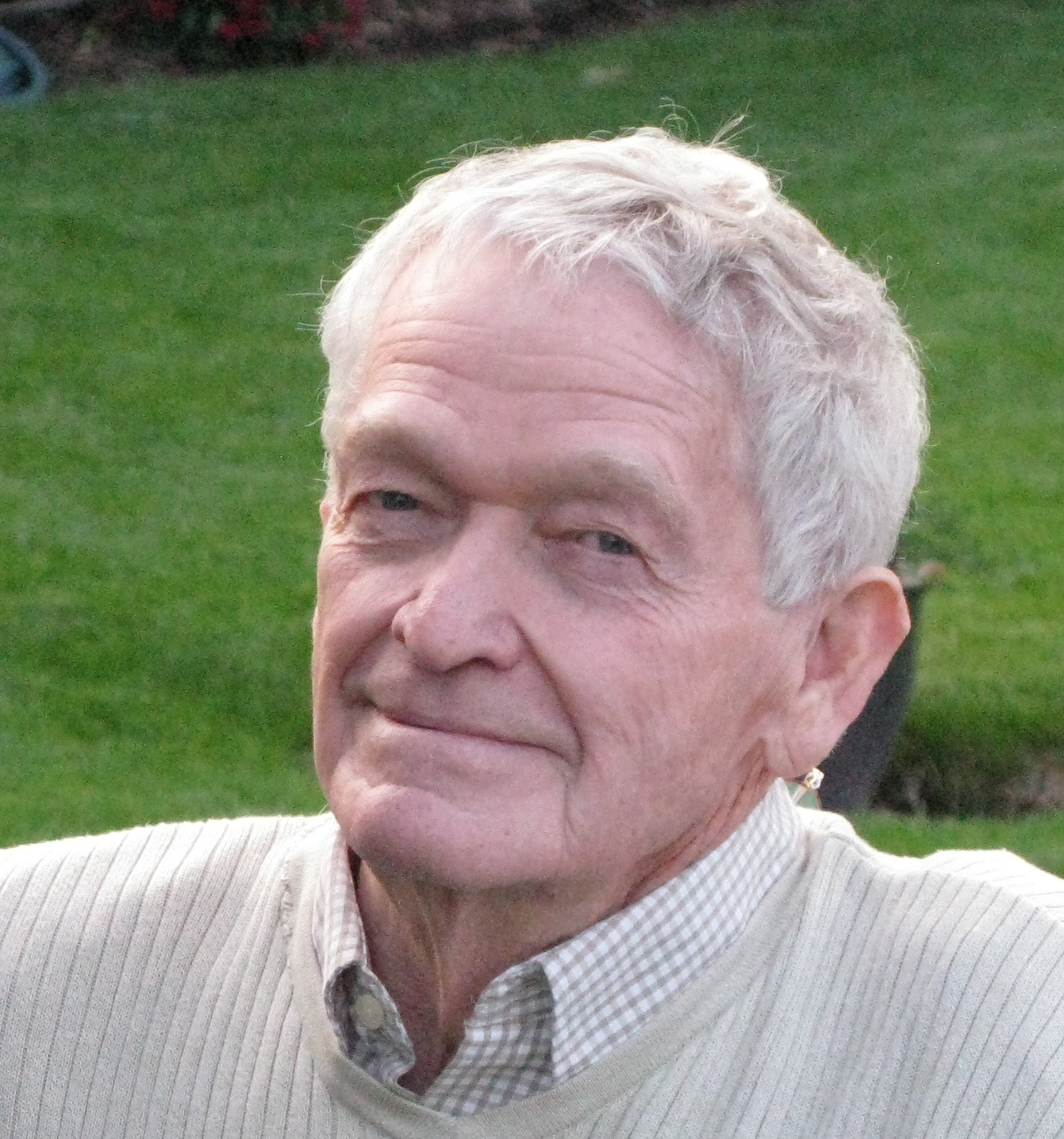
- Born: Kay Leroy Ruggles; June 5, 1932; Pocatello, Idaho, U.S.
- Died: May 16, 2012 (aged 79); Salt Lake City, Utah, U.S.
- Education: BS Industrial Design - University of Utah
- Occupations: Inventor, businessman
- Spouse: Beverly Jane Dallimore (m. 1952–2012)
- Children: Cary Leroy Ruggles (1954); Mark Bryant Ruggles (1957-1959); Nancy Kay Ruggles (1960); Carolyn Ruggles (1962); Bryan K Ruggles (1964); Lisa Marie Ruggles (1966); Bret K Ruggles (1968)
- Parent(s): Virgil LeRoy Ruggles (1907-1973); Emma Lucille Cazier (1912-1998)

Kay LeRoy Ruggles (June 5, 1932 - May 16, 2012) was an American inventor and designer known for UMBO shelving and furniture, invention of the tubular water slide, and the invention of the integral sink/countertop out of cultured marble. Ruggles also has many patents and designs related to window coverings. Kay has designed things in many different industries including manufacturing, bathroom fixtures, automotive, space, furniture, and musical instruments.

On Kay's 21st birthday, he was commissioned as an ensign to the U.S. Navy and was later appointed to the position of Lt. Jg USN Gunnery Officer on a destroyer. Kay worked on interesting projects throughout his life. He worked as a project engineer on the first fiberglass Corvette bodies at Molded Fiberglass and as a design engineer on Minuteman missiles at Hercules and Thiokol. He was partner at Associated Design Company which was later purchased by American Standard.

Kay was born June 5, 1932, to Virgil LeRoy Ruggles and Emma Lucille Cazier in Pocatello, Idaho. Kay graduated from South High School in 1949 on his 17th birthday; he later graduated from the University of Utah in 1953 with a BS in Industrial Design. As a student at the University of Utah, on September 20, 1952, he married Beverly Jane Dallimore and was later sealed to her in the Salt Lake City Temple on January 12, 1966.

Kay was also a conservative and avid listener and fan of The Rush Limbaugh Show.
