= Hal Anger =

American engineer and biophysicist (1920–2005)

- Hal Anger and Benedict Cassen at the International Conference on Peaceful Uses of Atomic Energy in Geneva, Switzerland, 1955
- Born: May 20, 1920; Denver, Colorado, U.S.
- Died: October 31, 2005 (aged 85); Berkeley, California, U.S.
- Education: University of California Berkeley
- Known for: gamma camera, well counter, Anger logic
- Awards: John Scott Award in 1964 for the development of the positron camera; Guggenheim Fellowship, 1966; Gesellschaft fur Medizin, 1971; honorary doctorate in science, Ohio State University, 1972; Nuclear Medicine Pioneer Citation, SNM, 1974; Modern Medicine Award for Distinguished Achievement, 1975; SNM First Western Regional award for distinguished contributions to nuclear medicine, 1976; Centennial Year Medal, Institute for Electrical and Electronics Engineers (IEEE), 1984; Societé Française de Biophysique et Médecine Nucléaire Medal, 1988; Georg de Hevesy Memorial Medal, Vienna, 1991; and Honorary Member and Fellow, American College of Nuclear Physicians, 1992
- Scientific career
- Fields: nuclear medicine, biomedical engineering
- Workplaces: Ernest O. Lawrence Radiation Laboratory

Hal Oscar Anger (May 20, 1920 – October 31, 2005) was an American electrical engineer and biophysicist at Donner Laboratory, University of California, Berkeley, known for his invention of the gamma camera.

In all, Anger held 15 patents, many of them for work at the Ernest O. Lawrence Radiation Laboratory. Anger received several awards in recognition of his inventions and their contributions to the field of nuclear medicine. Anger died in Berkeley, California.

== Career ==
In 1957, he invented the scintillation camera, known also as the gamma camera or Anger camera. Anger also developed the well counter, widely used in laboratory tests to measure radioactivity in samples. Anger also developed a multi-plane tomographic radiation scanner using the Anger camera and a focussed radiation collimator.

The first useful scintillation camera was developed by Anger at an AEC-funded laboratory at the University of California at Berkeley, California. Consequently, the patent rights on the invention were owned by the U.S. Government. However, Anger's supervisors at the lab were well connected with the head of the AEC, Glenn Seaborg, and prevailed on the AEC to release the patent rights to Anger personally. Anger retained patent counsel to file a U.S. patent application on his invention, and this application eventually matured into U.S. Patent 3,011,057, issued in November 1961. While his patent was pending, Anger tried unsuccessfully to interest nuclear instrument companies in taking a license on a non-exclusive basis to produce and sell the Anger camera. He eventually granted an exclusive license on the '057 patent to Nuclear-Chicago Corporation (NCC), in Des Plaines, Illinois. NCC successfully developed a commercially useful version of the Anger Camera and began marketing it to nuclear medical departments of hospitals in the United States. NCC's commercial sales of the Anger Camera grew substantially over the years and Anger became modestly wealthy from the royalties that he received under the exclusive license agreement. NCC was eventually acquired by G.D. Searle & Co, of Skokie, Illinois, and operated as a wholly owned subsidiary.

Nuclear-Chicago Corporation's exclusivity on marketing the Anger scintillation camera was eventually challenged by the introduction of a competing version of the Anger camera by Picker Corporation. NCC and Anger sued Picker for infringement of the '057 patent, and Picker counterclaimed for invalidity of the '057 patent. Picker also filed a proceeding in the Atomic Energy Commission, challenging the legitimacy of the AEC's release of the patent rights to Anger, and requesting a compulsory license under the '057 patent. The AEC proceeding was decided in favor of Anger and NCC, and the patent infringement lawsuit was eventually settled by the grant of a sublicense agreement to Picker. Other competitors later emerged and further litigation on the '057 patent was initiated. NCC was eventually sold to Siemens Corporation and Siemens continued to develop the technology of the Anger Camera and to market the device worldwide.

== Philanthropy ==
In 2006, the Society of Nuclear Medicine's Education and Research Foundation received $6 million from the Hal Anger Estate, the largest gift ever received for advancing the field of nuclear medicine, leading to the development of a Hal Anger Prize and Lecture.
