= Condenser telephone =

Device allowing telephone communication over Morse code telegraph

The condenser telephone, also known as the Phonopore telephone system, was an invention first patented in 1892 and subsequently introduced in many countries in large numbers, whereby telephone voice communications could be made over existing Morse code telegraph infrastructure at a low installation and running cost.

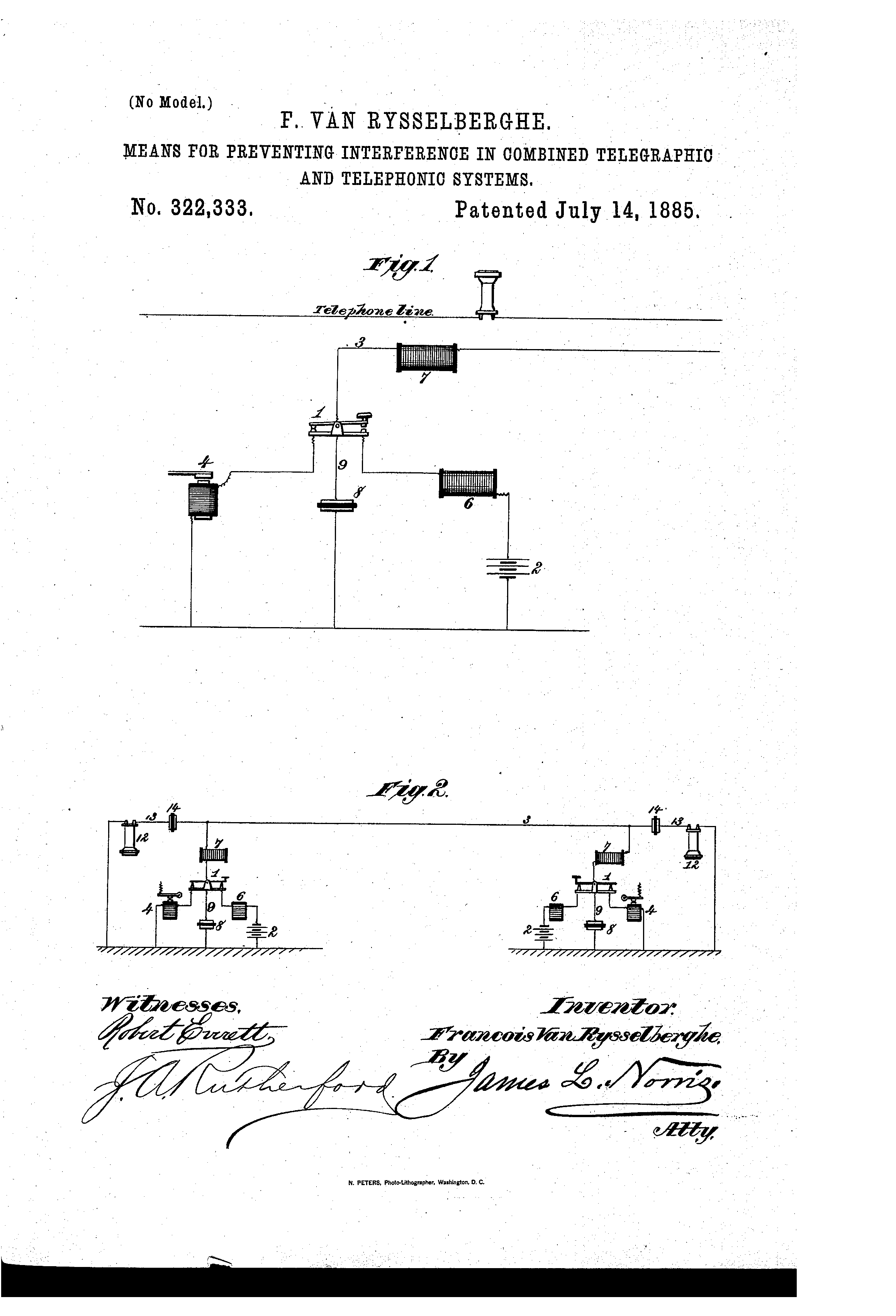
The 1895 Patent diagram of the Phonopore telephonic system

== Early communications ==
In the 1830s the first commercial telegraph system was constructed in England. Over time the system was perfected and across the world overhead telegraph lines were built at rapid pace to connected towns and countries. The telegraph system allowed immediate communications by Morse telegraph codes to pass important government, commercial and private messages which up until then were delivered by mail on coaches and horseback.

The Telegraph system operated for many decades until voice communications were experimented with and perfected. Voice communications over telephone equipment was trialed in the 1860s and by the 1870s basic telephone apparatus were being used in small applications. In 1877 the first successful long distance telephone line was constructed in California, USA.

== General description ==
Telegraph lines in rural areas typically used one wire earth return circuits, this is a system whereby one conductor is installed on insulators mounted on telegraph poles. The circuit return current travels back via the earth to the origin battery. One wire on a pole was very economical to build and one wire circuits expanded rapidly to remote rural communities. Telephone circuits as distinct from telegraph circuits ideally use two wires to provide a noise free line. Once telephone communications became more commonplace in big cities there became more interest in voice telephone lines for long distance communications to smaller centers remote from the cities. Voice messages improved the correctness of the information and could allow more messages to be sent including direct person to person communications. Telegraphs typically operated between two telegraph offices and the messages written on a telegraph note and hand delivered to the recipient.

In the 1890s and 1900s the Telegraph authorities were faced with the dilemma of modernising the old telegraph systems, then in use for 40 or more years, to new voice telephone systems. The cost to convert the hundreds of kilometers of overhead 'one wire' systems to 'two wire' for telephone would have been enormous. Extra wire, crossarms, and transposition of wires to reduce crosstalk all added to the conversion cost. Where conversion could be justified by high traffic levels, meaning high income from those busy lines, they were quickly converted to two wire telephone circuits, but in many cases the cost could not be justified. A method was invented whereby a telephone circuit could be established using the one wire and earth return method similar to the telegraph circuit method. The telegraph could be retained as this was still accepted as the basic method for transferring simple data someone similar to SMS text messages versus voice calls today.

One wire circuits were typically called earth return circuits, or sometimes 'non metallic' and two wire were also referred to as 'metallic circuits'. Metallic referring to a total metal (copper or steel) circuit for both legs of the circuit.

This basic telephone circuit was known as a Buzzer, or more commonly, a Condenser Telephone Circuit.

== Invention ==
A patent registered by François van Rysselberghe (1846-1893) in 1882 is thought to be the original invention of the basis of the phonopore (condensor) method. The technique was developed and improved by Charles Langdon-Davies in 1890, particularly with the invention of a method to call between phones Patents were lodged for improved versions of instruments for commercial use including one lodged by Ellis F Frost in 1902.

== Construction ==
The system worked over a single aerial telegraph wire. Using a coil of wire an inductor was formed that could filter the lower Morse frequency from the much higher voice frequency. The inductor blocked the higher voice frequency but allowed the low Morse frequency to pass. Similarly but opposite to the effect of the inductor, a condenser (capacitor) was installed that passed the higher voice frequency but blocked the low Morse frequency. The two separated frequencies were diverted the respective instruments, either the Morse instrument or the telephone instrument.

The Condenser system equipment was located at each end of a telegraph line in the telegraph equipment rooms. This limited the installation works to easy accessible buildings and avoided work on the aerial lines and poles that may extend for many kilometers, 50 kilometers and longer were not unusual.

== Cost savings ==
A report by the New South Wales Government details a saving of 93% by using the Condenser system as distinct from construction of a second telephone wire to provide a telephone service.
