= Heinrich Bertsch =

German chemist and inventor (1897-1981)

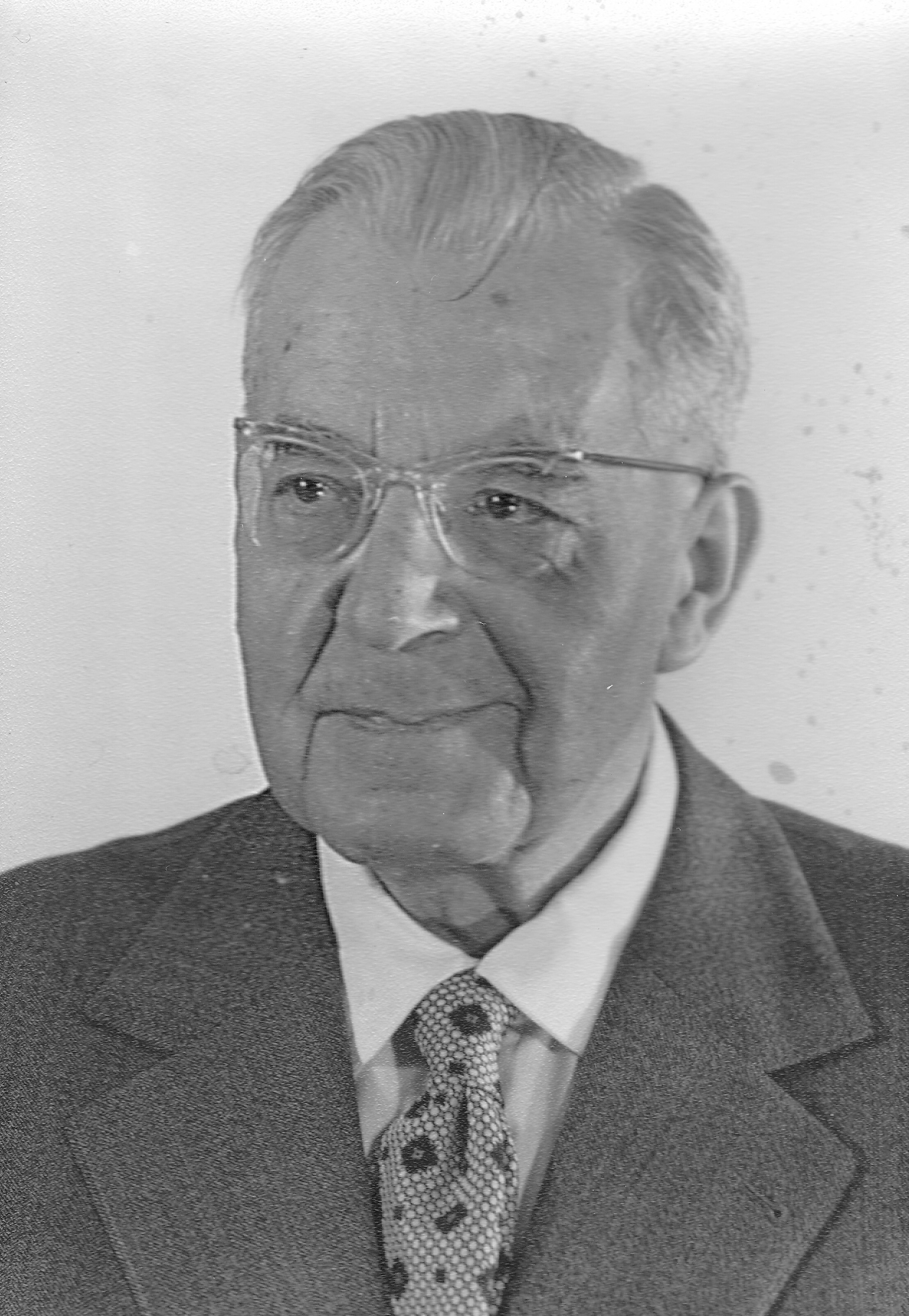
- Born: Heinrich Gottlob Bertsch; 11 January 1897; Rosenfeld, Kingdom of Württemberg, German Empire
- Died: 19 March 1981 (aged 84); East Berlin, East Germany
- Occupation: Chemist

Heinrich Gottlob Bertsch (11 January 1897 – 19 March 1981) was a German chemist. He is considered the inventor of the world's first fully synthetic detergent.

== Life ==
The son of an elementary school teacher, he attended the Oberrealschule in Ludwigsburg, where he graduated from high school in 1916. After his military service in World War I, he studied chemical technology from 1919 at the Technical University of Stuttgart and completed his studies with a diploma examination in 1921 and a doctorate in engineering in 1922. After initial positions in Stuttgart and Dresden, he took up a position as a chemist at H. Th. Böhme AG in Chemnitz on 1 August 1924, where he initially researched in the field of textile auxiliaries. In 1927 he was given power of attorney and was appointed chief chemist.

In 1932 Bertsch invented Fewa, the first mild detergent and at the same time the first fully synthetic detergent in the world. The great success of Fewa led to the Henkel Groups entry into Böhme in 1935 and the founding of Böhme-Fettchemie, of which Bertsch was a member of the Management Board from then on, before joining the Henkel Management Board in October 1941. There he was entrusted with the management of Henkel's Central German plant group, which included Böhme-Fettchemie, the Persil plant in Genthin and the German hydrogenation plants in Rodleben.

After the war, Bertsch remained the only leading Henkel manager in the Soviet Occupation Zone (SBZ) and joined the KPD. He took over the management of Böhme Fatty Chemistry and, in 1946, of the entire chemical industry in Saxony, which had been nationalized after the referendum in Saxony. At the beginning of 1949, he was promoted to head of the Central Chemical Administration of the German Economic Commission of the Soviet Occupation Zone (SBZ), and from 1950 he held the same position with the Minister of Industry of the GDR.

Also in 1950, Bertsch was first appointed part-time professor of chemical technology at the Humboldt University of Berlin. In 1953, he was accepted into the German Academy of Sciences (DAW) and was full-time director of the Academy Institute for Organic Chemistry from 1954 until his retirement in 1963. In 1958 he was also appointed director of the newly founded Institute of Fat Chemistry, was editor of the Chemisches Zentralblatt from 1958 to 1969 and was director of the Institute of Documentation from 1958 to 1961. From 1957 to 1963, he was also secretary of the chemistry, geology and biology class of the DAW.

Bertsch received several awards for his services in the GDR, including the National Prize of the GDR II. Klasse (1953) and the Patriotic Order of Merit in silver (1959).
