= Johann Kiefuss =

German inventor

Johann Kiefuss was a German inventor. He is sometimes credited with inventing the wheellock in Nuremberg in 1517. However, it is unlikely he was the actual inventor. The only traceable records of a Johann Kiefuss relate to a gun maker living in Nuremberg about 100 years later, so the misapprehension may be due to an incorrect transliteration of dates. His name is commonly linked to the gun, especially in German sources, from the late 18th century onwards. There is a possibility that Leonardo da Vinci was the inventor of the wheellock, but opinions remain divided.
