= Ahmed Majan =

Emirati inventor (born 1963)

Ahmed Majan (born c. 1963) is an Emirati inventor. Majan is a retired army major in the UAE Armed Forces who obtained an engineering degree in Greece.

== Inventions ==
His inventions include a "smart saddle" for racehorse training which contains solar-powered electronic devices that measure the heart rate of the animal being trained, the rider's weight, a compass and a location tracker, a device to cool the animal's body temperature during exercise in warm climates, and a hidden camera.

== Awards ==
As of 2024, his inventions have won a total of fourteen awards at the British Invention Show (British Inventors Society) in London (2013, six medals), the International Trade Fair for Ideas, Inventions and New Products (IENA) in Nuremberg (2014, four medals), and the International Exhibition of Inventions in Geneva (2015, four medals). He is in the Guinness Book of World Records for building the world's largest bicycle. Majan is also one of the awardees of the UAE Pioneers Award in 2014
