= Well counter =

Diagram of a well counter

A well counter is a device used for measuring radioactivity in small samples. It usually employs a sodium iodide crystal detector. It was invented in 1951 by Hal Anger, who is also well known for inventing the scintillation camera. Anger filed U.S. patent #2,779,876 on March 3, 1953 for his "Radio-Activity Distribution Detector"; the patent was issued on January 29, 1957.

== Construction and functioning ==
The well counter is so called because the samples are inserted into a well within the crystal in order to maximize sensitivity by collecting as many of the emitted gamma rays as possible.

Modern well counters can automatically record activity in different samples sequentially. Samples in test tubes are inserted into the well, one sample at a time, and counted for a predetermined time. Results are presented as a graphic, and corrected for the decay of the sample.

== See also ==
- Scintillation counter
- Gamma camera
