= Lightning switch =

Remote control switch technology

Lightning switch is a Wireless and batteryless remote control switch technology manufactured by PulseSwitch Systems, a member of The Face Companies Group of Norfolk, Virginia. It is most commonly used as a wireless light switch.

== Energy harvesting ==
The Lightning Switch transmitter requires no outside source of electricity. Each time the transmitter button is pressed, the transmitter converts the mechanical energy supplied by the user's finger into electricity to power a radio transmission to a receiver/relay through the use of a piezoelectric generator (brand name: Lightning) originally invented by the National Aeronautics and Space Administration. This technology is described in the 2005 issue of NASA Spinoff magazine.

== Technology ==
The Lightning Switch is featured in the 2007 Concept Home in Omaha, Nebraska, part of the Partnership for Advancing Technology in Housing (PATH) coordinated by the United States Department of Housing and Urban Development.

Lightning products were studied by HUD consultant Newport Partners, LLC of Davidsonville, Maryland USA.

Lightning Switch won a 2006 NOVA Award, the highest international honor for innovation in the construction industry.

In October 2007, NASA cited the employment of the Lightning piezoelectric generator in the Lightning Switch as one of the top 20 spinoff technologies produced over the previous five years, based on factors such as quality of life, economic benefit, and value back to NASA.

In March 2008, the Lightning Switch was chosen as the winner of the 2008 SPIE Smart Structures Product Implementation Award.

In 2012, the Lightning Switch was "Space Certified" by the Space Foundation.
