= Josephine G. Fountain =

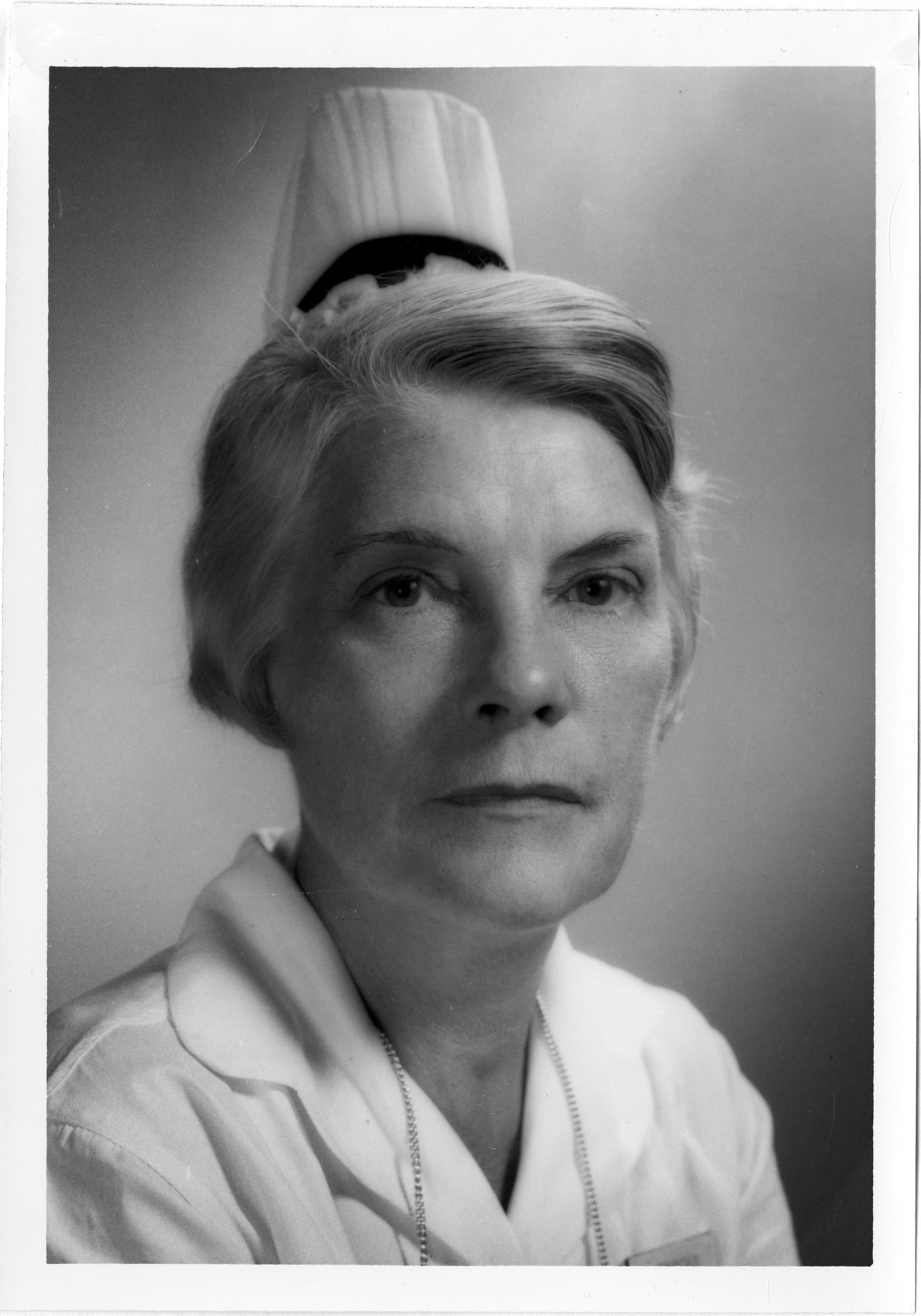
- Fountain during the 1960s
- Occupation: nurse
- Known for: inventing the direct suction trachaetomy tube

Josephine G. Fountain was a registered nurse (RN) at the University of Florida Teaching Hospital and Clinics, best remembered for inventing the direct suction tracheotomy tube and holding its patent (no. 3039469).

The significance of the direct suction tracheotomy tube is found in the way it addressed a persistent complication in tracheotomy operations; where the mucous secretions within a patient's trachea block a portion of the inner cannula tube and attempting to remedy the situation by inserting suction tube further blocks a patient's airways. As a result, the patient feels insecure and has trouble breathing. Fountain's patent for the direct suction tracheotomy tube answered this issue. The invention also was an improved tracheotomy tube that allowed introduction of gases other than air without reducing the diameter of the tube.

Fountain filed her application for the direct suction tracheotomy tube patent on May 9, 1960 and the patent was awarded on June 19, 1962. It has been cited 26 times by other patent applications.
