= Samuel Face =

American inventor

- Samuel Face, c. 1945
- Born: Samuel Allen Face Jr. August 2, 1923
- Died: May 2, 2001 (aged 77)
- Burial place: Elmwood Cemetery (Norfolk, Virginia), U.S.
- Occupation: Inventor

Samuel Allen Face Jr. (August 2, 1923 – May 2, 2001) was an American inventor and co-developer of some of the most important advances in concrete floor technology and Wireless controls.

== Early life ==
Face was born at the home of his maternal grandparents in City Point, Virginia. He attended Norfolk Public Schools and graduated from Matthew Fontaine Maury High School, the Norfolk Division of William and Mary/VPI (now Old Dominion University) and the Massachusetts Institute of Technology.

His maternal grandfather, J. Fred Muhlig (1876–1948), also an MIT graduate, once worked as an engineer under Thomas Edison in West Orange, New Jersey.

After four years of employment as a marine engineer and naval architect at the Newport News Shipbuilding and Dry Dock Company, in 1951, this ninth generation resident of Hampton Roads joined the family of companies founded by his great-grandfather Edward Webster Face (1829–1907) in 1865.

== Concrete Industry ==
Mr. Face was best known for his role in the 1970s, 80s and 90s in the development of the technologies and the design/installation practices that became the world standard for the specification, control and measurement of the flatness and levelness of concrete.

The Face Floor Profile Numbering System ("F-Numbers") has been adopted by the American Concrete Institute, the American Society for Testing and Materials, the Canadian Standards Association, the World Bank and is more widely used with each passing year. A system that is a slight modification of F-Numbers is used in much of Europe.

Sam Face's personal field consulting on construction projects in more than 20 countries helped create the modern industrial and commercial concrete floor. In the 1970s, working with Canada's top concrete contractor on numerous projects in greater Toronto, Mr. Face developed the placement and finishing practices that resulted in what he called "Superflat Floors," known to many at the time as "Sam Face floors." Superflat floors are now part of the standard lexicon of the concrete industry.

As of 2014, the consulting company he helped create had provided services on more than 8,000 projects on five continents.

The measuring instruments he co-invented have been used to measure billions of square feet of floors and roadways around the world and are specified by the United States Federal Highway Administration and the World Bank.

Over the last 20 years of Face's life, the use of the Face flat floor technologies and processes resulted in a 100% improvement in concrete floor flatness/levelness on the projects on which it was employed – usually at no additional cost to the building owner.

Face also designed and personally built a Superflat Grinder, which, according to the American Concrete Institute, produced the flattest concrete floor profiles ever measured.

== Piezoelectric Technologies & Lightning Switch ==
Late in his life, Face became interested in piezoelectric technology, which led to his company's development of the Lightning Switch and other improvements and applications of piezoelectric actuators, generators and sensors... and Transoner transformers.

== Achievements ==
Two of the technological innovations developed at The Face Companies under his leadership were recognized with NOVA Awards, the highest international honor for innovation in construction. Those innovations were Concrete Slab Flatness / F-Number System (1990) and The Lightning Switch Wireless Electric Switch (2006). As of 2017, no other company had been the sole developer of more than one NOVA-winning innovation.

The National Aeronautics and Space Administration named The Lightning Switch one of the top 20 spin-off developments using a core NASA technology of the early 21st century.

His life's work and accomplishments were recognized by a special Joint Resolution of the Virginia General Assembly in 2002.

For his contributions to the concrete industry, Sam Face was named a fellow of the American Concrete Institute by a unanimous vote of the selection committee.

Face was listed as an inventor on 31 United States patents... ranging from a concrete mixer... to a precision measuring device... to a wireless switch.

Face also is recognized by an award given in his honor. The Golden Trowels are highly prized awards in the concrete flooring industry. Presented by The Face Companies, Golden Trowels recognize the flattest and most level floor slabs placed in the world in the previous contest year. The Golden Trowels are announced each year at The World of Concrete in Las Vegas. A special Golden Trowel, The "Sam" Award was established in 2002 to honor "outstanding accomplishments in and contributions to the art and science of high quality horizontal concrete construction."

== Death ==
Sam Face died of cancer in the family home in the Larchmont section of Norfolk, Virginia in 2001, the home where his grandfather Muhlig, who had worked with Edison, died in 1948. He was buried in Elmwood Cemetery (Norfolk, Virginia).

== Sources ==
- Joint Resolution of the General Assembly of the Commonwealth of Virginia (2002)
- United States Patent and Trademark Office
- American Concrete Institute
- Golden Trowel News Release (January 2007), World of Concrete, Las Vegas
- Construction Innovation Forum archives
