= Wu Yulu =

Chinese farmer, inventor and roboticist

Wu Yulu is a Chinese farmer and inventor of home-made robots. He has become widely known for his fanciful creations made from scrap metal and other materials. He lives in Mawu Village, near Beijing.

== Career ==
He started making robots at about 11 years of age. With a different upbringing or education perhaps, Wu might have become an engineer. But his teachers were no good when he was school-aged, he said, so he stopped going. He learned to make robots by making mistakes.

In the late 1970s, Wu got a job at a farm machinery factory, and the small income helped him turn used sewing machine parts and some steel wire into his first robot. "Until now, I don't know the theory of physics, but I knew that electricity can drive motors and power can be transferred to the robot's hands and legs with levers and wires," Wu said. After his first robot turned out to be "disabled," Wu continued to experiment. In 1982, the first movable robot, Wu Laoda (the first son of the Wu), was born.

=== Robots ===
Wu's robots' given names indicate the order they are created, and they are all given his own family name (Wu). His most famous robot is named Wu . He has built robots capable of climbing walls, serving water, lighting cigarettes, playing musical instruments and writing calligraphy.

"I can invent robots able to carry a sedan chair, and next I will make robots of the 12 animals in the Chinese zodiac. "There are so many good things in life, and they become the basis for my robots".

== See also ==
- Science and technology in China
- List of Chinese inventions
