= Christian Schnabel =

German designer and inventor

Christian Leberecht Schnabel (May 13, 1878 – January 29, 1936) was a German designer and inventor.

== Biography ==
Schnabel was son of a German blacksmith and Russian seamstress. He was known for his original and innovative inventions. This made him an ideal victim of satire, from time to time Schnabel himself was asked to appear in smaller Cabaret-Shows and even a meeting with famous author Erich Kästner. Kästner was impressed by Schnabel and published a poem after his death about him in the book Dr. Erich Kästners lyrische Hausapotheke (1936). Later Schnabel was mentioned as one example for "the funny Germans" in an anthology. "The easy is the most difficult" is a famous word of Schnabel and it also became the principle of his life: Schnabel mostly experimented on everyday objects trying to improve them. Especially his simplistic food cutleries, which reached from a mixture between fork and knife up to a fork with only one prong became virtually legendary. Earning laughs for such inventions in his lifetime, today there are in more extensive cutlery sets not seldom found parts which are not unlike the Schnabel-Inventions around the turn of the century. Nevertheless, it seems to be possible, that Schnabel never wanted to invent useful objects and must be seen as a kind of early performance artist.
