= Ted Myerson =

American entrepreneur and business executive

- Occupation(s): Entrepreneur and business executive

Ted Nathan Myerson (born 1975) is an American entrepreneur and business executive who holds two U.S. patents for innovations in real-time risk management and data aggregation. Myerson coined the term “naked access” in 2009, calling on the SEC to ban it. He was quoted in the SEC Market Access Rule.

== FTEN Inc ==
Myerson founded the software startup FTEN Inc. in September 2001 at age 26, and sold it to The NASDAQ OMX Group for an undisclosed nine figures in December 2010, remaining in place as CEO. Former SEC Commissioner Annette Nazareth nominated FTEN for the 2010 National Medal of Technology Innovation. FTEN provides real-time intraday risk-management systems to the financial services industry.

In 2011, Myerson also became Global Head of Access Services for The NASDAQ OMX Group, overseeing four business units, including FTEN Inc. Access Services accounts for fifteen percent of The NASDAQ OMX Group's global revenue, approximately $223 million in 2012. Myerson also serves on the board of the FINRA/NASDAQ Trade Reporting Facility (TRF), and the New York Metro Board of Directors for The Network for Teaching Entrepreneurship (NFTE), a nonprofit foundation that provides entrepreneurship education to low-income youth globally.

== Real-time risk management technology ==
Myerson incorporated FTEN, which he named after the F10 key on the computer keyboard, on September 10, 2001, the day before the 9/11 terrorist attacks on the United States. After the attacks, Myerson decided to focus FTEN on protecting the U.S. financial markets. At that time, risk management was only available after the end of each trading day. It became clear to Myerson, however, that there was a need to aggregate risk management across different systems and markets in real-time.

The focus on real-time risk management paid off. In 2008, FTEN secured a $25 million Series B strategic investment from a consortium of Goldman Sachs, JP Morgan Chase & Co., Merrill Lynch and Credit Suisse. The company invested in real-time risk-management technology and expanded internationally.

Myerson's company revolutionized risk-management by making real-time intraday risk calculations possible. As a result, FTEN made the top 50 of Inc.’s 500 list twice, with a three-year growth rate of 4,531% as revenue climbed from $447,033 in 2006 to $20.7 million in 2009. FTEN was named one of Crain’s New York Business “Best Places to Work” in 2010 and Myerson was named a 2010 New York Enterprise Business Report Game Changer.

When it was acquired by NASDAQ OMX, FTEN's technology was processing over $150 billion in daily risk calculations globally, including over a third of U.S. equities volume.

== Anonos ==
Since 2012, Anonos has been developing technology that transforms data at the data element level enabling dynamic data obscurity that preserves the value of underlying data. Specifically, Anonos de-identification and dynamic data obscurity risk management tools provide trusted party control for data subjects enabling them to share information in a controlled manner to receive information, services and offerings truly personalized for them, while protecting misuse of their data. Dynamic data obscurity can facilitate improved healthcare, medical research and personalized medicine by enabling aggregation of patient level data without revealing the identity of patients.

== Patents ==
Myerson shares five U.S. patents with Gary LaFever, FTEN's chief corporate development officer and co-founder of Anonos. On August 17, 2011, the U.S. Patent & Trademark office issued a patent for their data cloud computing system that allows securities firms and potentially regulators to manage market-wide risks in real time.

The Financial Times called the patent, “a sign of how the provision of real-time risk management in the trading and clearing business is increasing in importance as regulators respond to the perceived risks associated with high-frequency trading.”

Myerson was also issued U.S. Patent 8,010,442 on August 30, 2010, for his contributions to a financial data system that aggregates trading data from disparate liquidity destinations; normalizes information into a common format; analyzes the data using user defined criteria; and provides alerts.

== Education and early career ==
Myerson holds a Bachelor of Science degree in business administration with double majors in accounting and finance from the University of Miami in 1997. After graduation, he worked as an accountant at Kaufman, Rossin, & Co., an auditor for hedge fund clients. He left Kaufman, Rossin & Co. in 1998 to start the Sterling Securities hedge fund, where he served as partner. In 1999, Myerson co-founded E.C.N. Access Europe in September 1998, a first-to-market technology company based in Spain that provided a Direct Market Access platform for access to liquidity markets around the globe.

== Operation Magic ==
A lifelong amateur magician, Myerson established his charity Operation Magic in 2012 to encourage children and young adults to learn the craft of magic in order to help them develop self-confidence and presentation skills. Operation Magic provides scholarships to send children to Tannen's Magic Camp at Bryn Mawr College each summer, and is funding a documentary film about legendary magician and teacher Bob Elliott.
