= Lloyd Trammell =

American inventor

Earnest Lloyd Trammell (born January 31, 1953), is an American inventor in the field of dimensional sound processing. Most known for selling the first working surround sound to Hughes Aircraft and working on the Peavey KOSMOS processors, Lloyd was also featured in an Electronic Musician Magazine article on sound design.

== History ==
In 2001, the KOSMOS debuts and is praised by top studio producers such as Kevin Shirley, who uses it to recreate the live sound of Jimmy Page's guitars on the hugely successful live Led Zeppelin DVD and Led Zeppelin: How the West Was Won releases.

Lloyd Trammell, Elon Ray Coats and Michael V. Powers filed for a patent on "Acoustic modeling apparatus and method" on September 3, 2002. They were awarded patent 6,627,808 on September 30, 2003. The invention enables an electric guitar to sound like an acoustic guitar. The invention has a bridge sensor and a body sensor. The bridge sensor is used to sense string vibrations and a body sensor is used to sense the resonance of the string vibrations. A summing circuit adds the amplified body reasonance signal to the amplified bridge signal to produce an output signal that sounds like an acoustic instrument.

Lloyd Trammell and Elon Ray Coats filed for a patent on "Sub-harmonic generator and stereo expansion processor" on February 8, 2005. They were awarded patent 7,203,320 on April 10, 2007. The invention filters an input signal to produce an intermediate signal which is then used to cancel energy in the output signal.

Lloyd Trammell and Elon Ray Coats filed for a patent on "Methods and apparatus for sub-harmonic generation, stereo expansion" on October 4, 2004. They were awarded patent 7,171,002 on January 30, 2007. The invention filters an input signal to produce an intermediate signal which is then used to cancel energy in the output signal.

Peavey Electronics Corporation, developed a sub-harmonic generator, called KOSMOS, based on patent 7,171,002 that avoids flat, cardboard sounding characteristics common to this type of process. The KOSMOS system achieves this by modifying frequency components at least partially outside the sub-harmonic range, and using the amplitude envelope of the input signal (as a function of frequency components in the relevant frequency range) in producing the output signal. The KOSMOS system also increases stereo width characteristics created by signals from left and right channels and improves sound clarity above certain frequencies.

In 2003, Lloyd Trammell was quoted in a review of the Peavey KOSMOS Pro in Mix Magazine explaining the unique characteristics of his invention.

Frank Serafine, composer/sound designer for TRON, The Hunt for Red October, Star Trek: The Motion Picture, and others, was known to use the Peavey KOSMOS to add definition and clarity to the low end of his surround-sound mixes. In an article for Pro Sound News, Serafine noted that the "KOSMOS Pro is the best and most versatile tool for sub-harmonic frequency generation that I've come across in my 22 years in the sound design business. It gives me a great deal of control over my mixes and removes a lot of the EQ'ing I used to have to do."

== Patents ==
Lloyd Trammell has been awarded eight patents for advancements in audio technology:

1. 7,136,493 for "Sub-harmonic generator and stereo expansion processor"
2. 6,627,808 for "Acoustic modeling apparatus and method""
3. 7,203,320 for "Sub-harmonic generator and stereo expansion processor"
4. 7,171,002 for "Methods and apparatus for sub-harmonic generation, stereo expansion"
5. 7,242,779 for "Methods and apparatus for sub-harmonic generation, stereo expansion and distortion"
6. 9,300,262 for "Audio processing application for Windows"
7. US9679427B2 for "Biometric Audio Security" https://patents.google.com/patent/US9679427B2/en
8. US20180270574 for “Dynamic Audio Enhancement Using an All-Pass Filter” https://patentscope.wipo.int/search/en/detail.jsf;jsessionid=F65866E40A4679F44282F2FD6A9B7E7D.wapp2nA?docId=US226141785&recNum=4303&office=&queryString=&prevFilter=&sortOption=Pub+Date+Desc&maxRec=70962897
