= Jacques de Kervor =

French inventor

Jacques Edouard de Kervor (August 13, 1928 – June 24, 2010) was an inventor and industrial designer.

Among de Kervor's achievements was one of Delta's first single-handle faucets. He also helped design the 1956 Ford Thunderbird.

De Kervor also designed equipment for Jacques Cousteau, a Voit jet diving fin, models for Disneyland, and the toy robot Maxx Steele. He also designed John Deere farm equipment, office equipment, televisions and toys.

De Kervor was born in Vichy, France. Though only 11 when his country fell to (Germany), he nevertheless fought for the resistance in World War II. In 1948 de Kervor moved to the United States but often returned to his native country. While in France as a youth he apprenticed as a sculptor, which led to work designing for Ford and Chrysler.

Other careers included artist, fashion designer, photographer and restaurant owner.

Later in life, de Kervor worked on decoy tanks and artillery in Columbia, South Carolina. He lived in Salisbury, North Carolina for a while, and in a 1997 Salisbury Post interview, he said, "I’ve made lots of people rich. But making money, making money – this is not all in life."

During his final days, he was working on a new faucet design and eye protection for military personnel. While being cared for by hospice, he even worked on improving the comfort of others in his situation.

De Kervor died in San Diego, where he lived two years, in June 2010. He had five children.
