= RFIQin =

Brand of cooking appliances

RFIQin logo

RFIQin, also referred to as RFIQ, is a patented automatic cooking device that consists of three different sized pans, a portable induction heater, and recipe cards, which is designed by Vita Craft Corporation, but is currently only sold in Japan through Vita Craft Japan. Electronics are embedded in the cookware, which monitor the food and send wireless signals to adjust the temperature of the induction heater accordingly; this prevents the loss of nutrients and saves thermal energy because the food is not overheated. Specialized recipe cards transmit a wireless signal to the RFIQin system when a recipe card is waved under the handle of the pan, initiating the cooking process. Each recipe card can include 23 distinct recipe steps. The recipe cards have cooking steps to follow that are indicated by a beeping sound from the induction heater. The system can cook almost all types of food, including cakes and fried foods.

Each pan is embedded with a RFID tag in the handle of cookware, which is covered by a special pan tag that protects the RFID tag from heat and moisture. A temperature sensor connected to the RFID tag is imbedded within a tunnel in the bottom center of the pan. The RFID tag monitors the food 16 times per second and transmits a proprietary signal to the |induction heater regarding the heating characteristics of the contents as well as the temperature of the contents to adjust the heat accordingly; the special pan tag is not battery powered and does not need to be recharged.

During the cooking process the food does not need to be monitored or stirred because the pans use waterless cooking methods and the induction heater uses alternating pulses to control the heat, so the liquid in the pans continually revolves in a circular motion. The RFIQin pans are built with a vapor seal that enables the pans to use techniques of pressure cooking. The portable induction heater and cookware can be used in a manual mode as a regular induction heater.

Popular Science reported RFIQin will cost $600; however, in May 2006, The Sacramento Bee reported that RFIQin costs $2,100 (241,500 yen) in Japan.

== See also ==
- Induction cooking
- Pressure cooking
