= John Brislin =

American inventor (1838–1907)

John Brislin (May 12, 1838 – March 27, 1907) was an American inventor who invented moveable rolling tables used for rolling large steel beams. These tables were a source of Andrew Carnegie's and U.S. Steel's fortunes. Brislin sued Carnegie on patent infringement, originally won and then the verdict was overturned on a technicality. Brislin went blind, lost his job as a janitor, and died in complete poverty.
