= List of Russian inventors =

This is a list of inventors from the Russian Federation, Soviet Union, Russian Empire, Tsardom of Russia and Grand Duchy of Moscow, including both ethnic Russians and people of other ethnicities.

This list also includes those who were born in Russia or its predecessor states but later emigrated, and those who were born elsewhere but immigrated to the country or worked there for a considerable time, (producing inventions on Russian soil).

For Russian inventions in chronological order, see the Timeline of Russian inventions and technology records.

== Alphabetical list ==
=== A ===
Portrait	Person	Inventions	Image
	Bruno Abakanowicz (1852–1900); Russian Empire; France (Poland/Lithuania origin)	Integraph, spirograph, parabolagraph	Spirograph designs
	Valerian Abakovsky (1895–1921); Russian Empire; Soviet Union; Latvia	aerowagon	
	Vitaly Abalakov (1906–1986); Russian Empire; Soviet Union	camming devices, Abalakov thread (V-thread) gearless ice climbing anchor	Spring-loaded camming device
	Evgeny Abramyan (1930–2014); Soviet Union; Russian Federation; Georgia	halyard for the first extra-vehicular activity	Space suit worn by Leonov during the first EVA
	Vsevolod Abramovich (1890–1913); Russian Empire; Soviet Union	Abramovich Flyer	
	Hovannes Adamian (1879–1932); Russian Empire; Soviet Union (Armenia/Azerbaijan/Germany)	tricolor principle of the color television	RGB color model
	Franz Aepinus (1724–1802); Holy Roman Empire; Russian Empire	achromatic microscope	
	Georgy Adelson-Velsky (1922–2014); Soviet Union; Russia; Israel	AVL tree datastructure, Kaissa (the first World Computer Chess Champion)	AVL Tree
	Anatoly Alexandrov (1903–1994); Russian Empire; Soviet Union; Russian Federation	anti-mine demagnetising of ships, naval nuclear reactors (including one for the first nuclear icebreaker)	Lenin, the first nuclear icebreaker
	Alexandre Alexeieff (1901–1982); Russian Empire; France	pinscreen animation (with his wife Claire Parker)	Pin Art
	Rostislav Alexeyev (1916–1980); Russian Empire; Soviet Union	ekranoplan, Soviet high-speed hydrofoils	A-90 Orlyonok ekranoplan.
	Zhores Alferov (1930–2019); Soviet Union; Russian Federation	heterotransistor (with Herbert Kroemer), continuous-wave-operating diode laser (with Dmitri Garbuzov)	Laser diode array
	Genrich Altshuller (1926–1998); Soviet Union; Russian Federation	TRIZ ("The Theory of Solving Inventor's Problems")	
	Vasily Andreyev (1861–1918); Russian Empire	standard balalaika	A souvenir balalaika
	Oleg Antonov (1906–1984); Russian Empire; Soviet Union	An-series aircraft, including Antonov A-40 winged tank and Antonov An-124 (the largest serial cargo aircraft, later modified to world's largest fixed-wing aircraft Antonov An-225)	An-124-100
	Lev Artsimovich (1909–1973); Russian Empire; Soviet Union	first tokamak	Tokamak scheme

=== B ===
Portrait	Person	Inventions	Image
	Georgy Babakin (1914–1971); Russian Empire; Soviet Union	first soft landing space vehicle (Luna 9)	
	Boris Babayan (born 1933); Soviet Union; Russia	Elbrus computer	
	Vladimir Baranov-Rossine (1888–1944); Russian Empire; France (Ukraine) (self-portrait)	Optophonic Piano, pointillist or dynamic military camouflage	A modern Canadian digital camouflage
	Vladimir Barmin (1909–1993); Russian Empire; Soviet Union; Russian Federation	first rocket launch complex (Baikonur spaceport)	Baikonur spaceport souvenir
	Nikolay Basov (1922–2001); Soviet Union; Russian Federation	co-inventor of laser and maser	Laser beams
	Ernest Beaux (1881–1961); Russian Empire; France	Chanel No. 5	Chanel No. 5.
	Vladimir Bekhterev (1857–1927); Russian Empire; Soviet Union	Bekhterev's mixture (a medicine with a sedative effect)	Sodium bromide, a part of Bekhterev's mixture
	Nikolay Benardos (1842–1905); Russian Empire	arc welding (specifically carbon arc welding, the first arc welding method)	The first arc welding method, Electro Hephaestus
	Aleksandr Bereznyak (1912–1974); Russian Empire; Soviet Union (left on photo)	first rocket-powered fighter aircraft, BI-1 (together with Isaev)	BI-1
	Georgy Beriev (1903–1979); Russian Empire; Soviet Union (Georgian origin)	Be-series amphibious aircraft	Beriev Be-12 Chayka
	Fyodor Blinov (1827–1902); Russian Empire	first tracked vehicle (a wagon on continuous tracks), steam-powered caterpillar tractor	Blinov's caterpillar steam tractor
	Sam Born (1891–1959); Russian Empire; United States	lollipop-making machine	A particularly large lollipop
	Georgy Bothezat (1882–1940); Russian Empire; United States	quadrotor helicopter (The Flying Octopus)	De Bothezat's quadrotor helicopter.
	Sergey Brin (born 1973); Soviet Union; United States	with Larry Page, invented Google web search engine	Google Search logo
	Mikhail Britnev (1822–1889); Russian Empire	first metal-hull icebreaker (Pilot)	Icebreaker Pilot on a postage stamp
	Nikolay Brusentsov (1925–2014); Soviet Union; Russian Federation	ternary computer (Setun)	
	Gersh Budker (1918–1977); Soviet Union	electron cooling, co-inventor of collider	Electron beam
	Aleksandr Butlerov (1828–1886); Russian Empire	hexamine, formaldehyde, formose reaction (the synthesis of sugar)	Formaldehyde formula

=== C ===
Portrait	Person	Inventions	Image
	Vladimir Chelomey (1914–1984); Russian Empire; Soviet Union	first space station (Salyut 1), further space stations of Salyut series, Proton rocket (the most used heavy lift launch system)	
	Pavel Cherenkov (1904–1990); Russian Empire; Soviet Union	Cherenkov detector	Cherenkov radiation
	Evgeniy Chertovsky (1902–?); Russian Empire; Soviet Union; Russian Federation	pressure suit	Pressure suit
	Alexander Chizhevsky (1897–1964); Russian Empire; Soviet Union	air ionizer (Chizhevsky's chandelier)	A modern air ionizer
	Andrey Chokhov (c. 1545–1629); Grand Duchy of Moscow; Tsardom of Russia	Tsar Cannon, the largest bombard by caliber but inoperative	The Tsar Cannon

=== D ===
Portrait	Person	Inventions	Image
	Vasily Degtyaryov (1880–1949); Russian Empire; Soviet Union	first self-loading carbine, Degtyaryov-series firearms, co-developer of Fedorov Avtomat (the first self-loading rifle)	
	Akinfiy Demidov (1678–1745); Tsardom of Russia; Russian Empire	co-developer of rebar, cast iron cupola, lightning rod (all found in the Leaning Tower of Nevyansk)	Rebars inside the Leaning Tower of Nevyansk.
	Yuri Denisyuk (1927–2006); Soviet Union; Russian Federation	3D holography	Denisyuk holography scheme
	Aleksandr Dianin (1851–1918); Russian Empire	Bisphenol A, Dianin's compound	Bisphenol A formula
	Mikhail Dolivo-Dobrovolsky (1862–1919); Russian Empire (Poland, Germany)	three-phase electric power (first 3-phase hydroelectric power plant, 3-phase electrical generator, 3-phase motor and 3-phase transformer)	3-phase electrical generator on exhibition in Frankfurt,1891
	Nikolay Dollezhal (1899–2000); Russian Empire; Soviet Union; Russian Federation	AM-1 reactor for the first nuclear power plant and other RBMK-type reactors, pressurized water reactor (VVER)	VVER-1000 nuclear reactor
	Alexey Dushkin (1904–1977); Russian Empire; Soviet Union	deep column station	

=== E ===
Portrait	Person	Inventions	Image
	Ivan Elmanov; Russian Empire	first monorail (the so-called "Road on Pillars" near Moscow, with horse-drawn carriages)	Modern Moscow Monorail

=== F ===
Portrait	Person	Inventions	Image
	Peter Carl Fabergé (1846–1920); Russian Empire	Fabergé Eggs	Memory of Azov Egg
	Nicolas Florine (1891–1972); Russian Empire; Belgium (born in Georgia)	first tandem rotor helicopter to fly freely	A modern tandem rotor helicopter
	Ivan Fyodorov (c. 1510–1583); Grand Duchy of Moscow; Tsardom of Russia; Poland-Lithuania	invented multibarreled mortar, introduced printing in Russia	Fedorov depicted in his typography
	Svyatoslav Fyodorov (1927–2000); Soviet Union; Russian Federation	radial keratotomy	
	Vladimir Fyodorov (1874–1966); Russian Empire; Soviet Union	Fedorov Avtomat (first self-loading battle rifle, arguably the first assault rifle)	

=== G ===
Portrait	Person	Inventions	Image
	Yakov Modestovich Gakkel (1874–1945); Russian Empire; Soviet Union	first Russian-made aircraft and diesel locomotives	The Gakkel-VII
	Boris Borisovich Galitzine (1862–1916); Russian Empire	electromagnetic seismograph	An electric seismograph
	Dmitri Garbuzov (1940–2006); Soviet Union; Russian Federation; United States	continuous-wave-operating diode lasers (together with Zhores Alferov), high-power diode lasers	Laser diode array
	Georgy Gause (1910–1986); Russian Empire; Soviet Union	gramicidin S, neomycin, lincomycin and other antibiotics	Gramicidin S formula
	E. K. Gauzen; Russian Empire	three bolt equipment (early diving costume)	A Soviet diving helmet
	Andrey Geim (born 1958); Soviet Union; United Kingdom	graphene	Graphene
	Nestor Genko (1839–1904); Russian Empire	Genko's Forest Belt (the first large-scale windbreak system)	
	Valentyn Glushko (1908–1989); Russian Empire; Soviet Union	hypergolic propellant, electric propulsion, Soviet rocket engines (including world's most powerful liquid-fuel rocket engine RD-170)	RD-170 rocket engine model
	Leonid Gobyato (1875–1915); Russian Empire	first modern man-portable mortar	Gobyato's mortar
	Igor Gorynin (1926–2015); Soviet Union; Russian Federation	weldable titanium alloys, high strength aluminium alloys, radiation-hardened steels	Titanium
	Boris Grabovsky (1901–1966); Russian Empire; Soviet Union	cathode commutator, an early electronic TV pickup tube	A modern cathode ray tube
	Mikhail Gurevich (1893–1976); Russian Empire; Soviet Union (left on photo)	MiG-series fighter aircraft, including world's most produced jet aircraft MiG-15 and most produced supersonic aircraft MiG-21 (together with Artem Mikoyan)	MiG-21

=== H ===
Portrait	Person	Inventions	Image
	Waldemar Haffkine (1860–1930); Russian Empire; Switzerland	developed and used first vaccines against cholera and bubonic plague	An injection of anti-plague vaccine

=== I ===
Portrait	Person	Inventions	Image
	Gavriil Ilizarov (1921–1992); Soviet Union; Russian Federation	Ilizarov apparatus, external fixation, distraction osteogenesis	Ilizarov apparatus
	Sergey Ilyushin (1894–1977); Russian Empire; Soviet Union	Il-series fighter aircraft, including Ilyushin Il-2 bomber (the most produced military aircraft in history)	
	Aleksei Isaev (1908–1971); Russian Empire; Soviet Union (second left on photo)	first rocket-powered fighter aircraft, BI-1 (together with Bereznyak)	BI-1
	Isidore; Grand Duchy of Moscow	Russian vodka	
	Vladislav Ivanov (1936–2007); Soviet Union; Russian Federation	Pioneer of Magnetic resonance imaging	MRI

=== J ===
Portrait	Person	Inventions	Image
	Boris Jacobi (1801–1874); Prussia; Russian Empire	electrotyping (an application of electroplating to typography), electric boat	Early electroplating

=== K ===
Portrait	Person	Inventions	Image
	Mikhail Kalashnikov (1919–2013); Soviet Union; Russian Federation	AK-47 and AK-74 assault rifles (produced more than all other types of assault rifles combined)	AK-47
	Nikolay Kamov (1902–1973); Russian Empire; Soviet Union	armored military autogyro, Ka-series coaxial rotor helicopters	
	Pyotr Kapitsa (1894–1984); Russian Empire; Soviet Union (left on portrait by Boris Kustodiev, with Nikolay Semyonov right)	first ultrastrong magnetic field creating techniques, basic low-temperature physics inventions	The liquid helium in the superfluid phase
	Georgii Karpechenko (1899–1941); Russian Empire; Soviet Union	rabbage (the first ever non-sterile hybrid obtained through the crossbreeding)	Radish and cabbage
	Eugene Kaspersky (born 1965); Soviet Union; Russian Federation	Kaspersky Anti-Virus, Kaspersky Internet Security, Kaspersky Mobile Security anti-virus products	Kaspersky Anti-Virus Logo
	Semyon Kataev (1904–1991); Soviet Union	radio electronics	
	Adolphe Kégresse (1879–1943); France; Russian Empire	Kégresse track (first half-track and first off-road vehicle with continuous track), dual-clutch transmission	Nicholas II Packard Twin-6 with Kégresse track
	Alexander Kemurdzhian (1921–2003); Soviet Union; Russian Federation	first space exploration rover (Lunokhod)	
	Yulii Khariton (1904–1996); Russian Empire; Soviet Union; Russian Federation	chief designer of the Soviet atomic bomb, co-developer of the Tsar Bomba	
	Anatoly Kharlampiyev (1906–1979); Russian Empire; Soviet Union	Sambo (martial art)	
	Konstantin Khrenov (1894–1984); Russian Empire; Soviet Union	underwater welding	A modern underwater welding
	Nikolai Kibalchich (1853–1881); Russian Empire	pioneer of rocketry	A Soyuz-U, at Baikonur Site 1/5
	Semyon Kirlian (1898–1978); Russian Empire; Soviet Union	Kirlian photography	Kirlian photo of two coins
	Konstantin Konstantinov (1817/19–1871); Russian Empire	device for measuring flight speed of projectiles, ballistic rocket pendulum, launch pad, rocket-making machine	Trajectory of a bullet
	Sergei Korolev (1907–1966); Russian Empire; Soviet Union	first successful intercontinental ballistic missile (R-7 Semyorka), R-7 rocket family, Sputniks (including the first Earth-orbiting artificial satellite), Vostok programme (including the first human spaceflight)	Vostok spacecraft model
	Nikolai Korotkov (1874–1920); Russian Empire	auscultatory technique for blood pressure measurement	Aneroid sphygmomanometer with stethoscope
	Semyon Korsakov (1787–1853); Russian Empire	punched card for information storage	Korsakov's linear homeoscope
	Mikhail Koshkin (1898–1940); Russian Empire; Soviet Union	T-34 medium tank, the most produced tank of World War II	T-34
	Ogneslav Stepanovich Kostovich (1851–1916); Serbia; Russian Empire	arborite (high-strength plywood)	Plywood
	Gleb Kotelnikov (1872–1944); Russian Empire; Soviet Union	knapsack parachute, drogue parachute	A modern knapsack parachute packed
	Aleksey Krylov (1863–1945); Russian Empire; Soviet Union	gyroscopic damping of ships	Gyroscope
	Ivan Kulibin (1735–1818); Russian Empire	egg-shaped clock, candle searchlight, elevator using screw mechanisms, self-rolling carriage (for the first time featuring a flywheel, brake, gear box, and bearing), an early optical telegraph	Kulibin's project of the one-arch bridge over Neva River.
	Igor Kurchatov (1903–1960); Russian Empire; Soviet Union	first nuclear power plant, first nuclear reactors for submarines and surface ships	Obninsk nuclear plant

=== L ===
Portrait	Person	Inventions	Image
	Dmitry Lachinov (1842–1902); Russian Empire	mercury pump, economizer for electricity consumption, electrical insulation tester, optical dynamometer, photometer, electrolyser	The details of electrical insulation tester depicted in a Lachinov's book
	Semyon Lavochkin (1900–1960); Russian Empire; Soviet Union	La-series aircraft, the first operational surface-to-air missile S-25 Berkut	Lavochkin La-7
	Nikolai Lebedenko; Russian Empire	Tsar Tank, the largest armored vehicle in history	Tsar Tank
	Sergei Lebedev (1874–1934); Russian Empire; Soviet Union	commercially viable synthetic rubber	Synthetic rubber making
	Lisitsyns, Ivan Fyodorovich and his brother Nazar Fyodorovich; Russian Empire	Russian samovar	A typical samovar
	Alexander Lodygin (1847–1923); Russian Empire; United States	electrical filament, incandescent light bulb with tungsten filament	Lodygin's lamp draw
	Mikhail Lomonosov (1711–1765); Tsardom of Russia; Russian Empire	night vision telescope, off-axis reflecting telescope, coaxial rotor, original Russian hard-paste porcelain (together with Dmitry Vinogradov), re-discovery of smalt	Lomonosov's drawings for his discovery of Venus atmosphere
	Yury Lomonosov (1876–1952); Russian Empire; Soviet Union; United Kingdom	first successful mainline diesel locomotive	The Юэ 001 locomotive
	Aleksandr Loran (1849 – after 1911); Russian Empire	fire fighting foam, foam extinguisher	Modern usage of fire fighting foam.
	Oleg Losev (1903–1942); Russian Empire; Soviet Union	light-emitting diode, crystadine	Red, green and blue LEDs
	Gleb Lozino-Lozinskiy (1909–2001); Russian Empire; Soviet Union; Russian Federation	Buran (spacecraft), Spiral project	Buran carried by the An-225
	Arkhip Lyulka (1908–1984); Russian Empire; Soviet Union	first double jet turbofan engine, other Soviet aircraft engines	Saturn AL-31

=== M ===
Portrait	Person	Inventions	Image
	Aleksandr Makarov (born 1966); Soviet Union; Russian Federation; Germany	orbitrap	Ion trajectories in an Orbitrap
	Stepan Makarov (1849–1904); Russian Empire	Icebreaker Yermak, the first true icebreaker able to ride over and crush pack ice	Icebreaker Yermak on the Baltic Sea before 1917
	Nestor Makhno (1888–1934); Russian Empire; France (Ukraine)	tachanka	
	Victor Makeev (1924–1985); Russian Empire; Soviet Union	first intercontinental submarine-launched ballistic missile	Scheme of R-27 missile of Makeev
	Dmitri Maksutov (1896–1964); Russian Empire; Soviet Union	Maksutov telescope	Maksutov-Cassegrain telescope.
	Sergey Malyutin (1859–1937); Russian Empire; Soviet Union (self-portrait)	matryoshka doll (together with craftsman Vasily Zvyozdochkin)	Original matryoshka doll by Malyutin and Zvyozdochkin
	Boris Mamyrin (1919–2007); Soviet Union; Russian Federation	reflectron (ion mirror)	Reflectron mass spectrometer
	Ilya Mechnikov (1845–1916); Russian Empire; France	probiotics	
	Dmitri Mendeleev (1834–1907); Russian Empire	Periodic table, a type of pycnometer, pyrocollodion, co-developer of Icebreaker Yermak, also credited with determining the ideal vodka proof as 38% (later rounded to 40%)	Periodic table from Mendeleev's book
	Artem Mikoyan (1905–1970); Russian Empire; Soviet Union (Armenia) (right on photo)	MiG-series fighter aircraft, including world's most produced jet aircraft MiG-15 and most produced supersonic aircraft MiG-21 (together with Mikhail Gurevich)	MiG-15
	Alexander Mikulin (1895–1985); Russian Empire; Soviet Union	Mikulin AM-34 and other Soviet aircraft engines, co-developer of the Tsar Tank	Mikulin and his staff presenting Mikulin AM-34
	Mikhail Mil (1909–1970); Russian Empire; Soviet Union	Mi-series helicopter aircraft, including Mil Mi-8 (the world's most-produced helicopter) and Mil Mi-12 (the world's largest helicopter)	Mil Mi-8
	Pavel Molchanov (1893–1941); Russian Empire; Soviet Union	radiosonde	
	Alexander Morozov (1904–1979); Russian Empire; Soviet Union	T-54/55 (the most produced tank in history), co-developer of T-34	T-54/55 main battle tank
	Sergei Mosin (1849–1902); Russian Empire	Mosin–Nagant rifle, one of the most produced ever	Mosin–Nagants
	Motorins, Ivan Feodorovich (1660s – 1735) and his son Mikhail Ivanovich (?–1750); Tsardom of Russia; Russian Empire	Tsar Bell, the largest bell in the world	The Tsar Bell
	Vera Mukhina (1889–1953); Russian Empire; Soviet Union	welded sculpture	Worker and Kolkhoz Woman, the first welded sculpture
	Yevgeny Murzin (1914–1970); Russian Empire; Soviet Union	ANS synthesizer	ANS synthesizer

=== N ===
Portrait	Person	Inventions	Image
	Alexander Nadiradze (1914–1987); Russian Empire; Soviet Union (born in Georgia)	First meteorological missile "M1-Meteo". First mobile ICBM (RT-21 Temp 2S), also RSD-10 Pioneer and (RT-2PM Topol)	RT-2PM Topol
	Andrey Nartov (1683–1756); Tsardom of Russia; Russian Empire	first lathe with a mechanic cutting tool-supporting carriage and a set of gears, fast-fire battery on a rotating disc, screw mechanism for changing the artillery fire angle, gauge-boring lathe for cannon-making, early telescopic sight	An old lathe (b marks the carriage)
	Sergey Nepobedimiy (1921–2014); Soviet Union; Russian Federation	first supersonic anti-tank guided missile Sturm, other Soviet rocket weaponry	Strela 2 surface-to-air missile
	Nikolai Nikitin (1907–1973); Russian Empire; Soviet Union	prestressed concrete with wire ropes structure (Ostankino Tower, The Motherland Calls), Nikitin-Travush 4000 project (precursor to X-Seed 4000)	Ostankino Tower (on the left)
	Ludvig Nobel (1831–1888); Sweden; Russian Empire	first successful oil tanker	A modern oil tanker
	Konstantin Novoselov (born 1974); Soviet Union; Russian Federation; United Kingdom	graphene (youngest Nobel Laureate since 1973)	Graphene

=== O ===
Portrait	Person	Inventions	Image
	Theophil Wilgodt Odhner (1845–1903); Sweden; Russian Empire	the Odhner Arithmometer (a mechanical pinwheel calculator)	Odhner Arithmometer
	Lucien Olivier (1838–1883); Russian Empire (Belgian or French origin)	Russian salad (Olivier salad)	Russian salad

=== P ===
Portrait	Person	Inventions	Image
	Alexey Pajitnov (born 1956); Soviet Union; United States	Tetris	Tetris figures
	Ivan Pavlov (1849–1936); Russian Empire; Soviet Union	classical conditioning	One of the Pavlov's dogs with an implanted cannula.
	Vasily Petrov (1761–1834); Russian Empire	continuous electric arc, arc welding	Electric arc
	Nikolay Pirogov (1810–1881); Russian Empire	early use of ether as anaesthetic, first anaesthesia in a field operation, various kinds of surgical operations	Diethyl ether
	Fyodor Pirotsky (1845–1898); Russian Empire	electric tram	Miller's line where Pirotsky's tram was tested
	Ivan Plotnikov (1902–1995); Russian Empire; Soviet Union; Russian Federation	kirza leather	Kirza boots.
	Nikolai Polikarpov (1892–1944); Russian Empire; Soviet Union	Po-series aircraft, including Polikarpov Po-2 Kukuruznik (world's most produced biplane)	Polikarpov Po-2
	Ivan Polzunov (1728–1766); Russian Empire	first two-cylinder steam engine	Polzunov's steam engine
	Mikhail Pomortsev (1851–1916); Russian Empire	nephoscope	Nephoscope measures the parameters of clouds
	Alexander Popov (1859–1906); Russian Empire	built an early radio receiver in the form of a lightning detector, eastern European countries claim he is the "inventor of radio"	Popov and his radio
	Nikolay Popov (1931–2008); Soviet Union; Russian Federation	first fully gas turbine main battle tank (T-80)	T-80 main battle tank
	Aleksandr Porokhovschikov (1892 – c. 1942); Russian Empire; Soviet Union	Vezdekhod (the first prototype tank, or tankette, and the first continuous track amphibious ATV)	Vezdekhod tank in 1915
	Alexander Procofieff de Seversky (1894–1974); Russian Empire; United States	ionocraft, first gyroscopically stabilized bombsight, also developed air-to-air refueling	Modern air-to-air refueling
	Alexander Prokhorov (1916–2002); Russian Empire; Soviet Union; Russian Federation	co-inventor of laser and maser	Laser beams
	Petro Prokopovych (1775–1850); Russian Empire (Ukraine)	beehive frame, queen excluder and other beekeeping novelties	A shallow super frame filled with honey
	Sergey Prokudin-Gorsky (1863–1944); Russian Empire; France	early colour photography method based on three colour channels, also colour film slides and colour motion pictures	Prokudin-Gorsky's method

=== R ===
Portrait	Person	Inventions	Image
	Leonid Ramzin (1887–1948); Russian Empire; Soviet Union	straight-flow boiler (Ramzin boiler)	
	Peter I of Russia (Romanov) (1672–1725); Tsardom of Russia; Russian Empire	decimal currency, yacht club, sounding line with separating plummet (sounding weight probe)	Sounding line throwing
	Ida Rosenthal (1886–1973); Russian Empire; United States (born in Belarus, Jewish descent)	modern brassiere (Maidenform), the standard of cup sizes, nursing bra, full-figured bra, the first seamed uplift bra (all with her husband William)	A modern brassiere
	Boris Rosing (1869–1933); Russian Empire; Soviet Union	CRT television (first TV system using cathode ray tube on the receiving side)	A modern cathode ray tube
	Eugene Roshal (born 1972); Soviet Union; Russian Federation	FAR file manager, RAR file format, WinRAR file archiver	FAR Manager screenshot

=== S ===
Portrait	Person	Inventions	Image
	Alexander Sablukov (1783–1857); Russian Empire	centrifugal fan	Components of a centrifugal fan
	Andrei Sakharov (1921–1989); Soviet Union	explosively pumped flux compression generator, co-developer of the Tsar Bomb, co-developer of tokamak	Hollow tube generator
	Franz San Galli (1824–1908); Russian Empire (Italian and German descent, born in Poland)	radiator, modern central heating	A household radiator
	Pavel Schilling (1780–1836); Russian Empire (Estonia)	shielded cable, electric mine and electromagnetic telegraph	Cooke and Wheatstone's telegraph, inspired by Schilling's one
	Guy Severin (1926–2008); Soviet Union; Russian Federation	extra-vehicular activity supporting system	
	Leonty Shamshurenkov (1687–1758); Tsardom of Russia; Russian Empire	a device for lifting the Tsar Bell, the first self-propelling carriage (a precursor to both bicycle and automobile), projects of an original odometer and self-propelling sledge	A reconstruction of Shamshurenkov's self-running carriage
	Pyotr Shilovsky (1871 – after 1924); Russian Empire; United Kingdom	gyrocar	Shilovsky's gyrocar in 1914, London
	Vladimir Shukhov (1853–1939); Russian Empire; Soviet Union	thermal cracking (Shukhov cracking process), thin-shell structure, tensile structure, hyperboloid structure, gridshell, modern oil pipeline, cylindric oil depot	Shukhov Tower in Moscow
	Pyotr Shuvalov (1711–1762); Tsardom of Russia; Russian Empire	invented canister shot mortar, introduced licorne into wide usage	A "secret" canister shot mortar
	Igor Sikorsky (1889–1972); Russian Empire; United States	first four-engine fixed-wing aircraft (Russky Vityaz), first airliner and purpose-designed bomber (Ilya Muromets), modern helicopter, Sikorsky-series helicopters	Sikorsky Skycrane carrying a house
	Vladimir Simonov (1935–2020); Soviet Union; Russian Federation	APS Underwater Assault Rifle, SPP-1 underwater pistol	APS Underwater Assault Rifle
	Nikolay Slavyanov (1854–1897); Russian Empire	shielded metal arc welding	Shielded metal arc welding
	Alexander Smakula (1900–1983); Russian Empire; United States (Ukraine)	anti-reflective coating	
	Yefim Smolin; Tsardom of Russia; Russian Empire	table-glass (stakan granyonyi)	A classic table-glass
	Igor Spassky (1926–2024); Soviet Union; Russian Federation	Sea Launch platform and over 200 nuclear submarines, including the world's largest submarines of Typhoon class	Sea Launch platform Ocean Odyssey
	Ladislas Starevich (1882–1965); Russian Empire; France (Polish descent)	puppet animation, live-action/animated film	Scene from The Cameraman's Revenge animation (1911)
	Boris Stechkin (1891–1969); Russian Empire; Soviet Union	co-developer of Sikorsky Ilya Muromets and Lebedenko's Tsar Tank, developer of many Soviet heat and aircraft engines	Sikorsky Ilya Muromets
	Aleksandr Stoletov (1839–1896); Russian Empire	first solar cell based on the outer photoelectric effect	A modern solar cell
	Pavel Sukhoi (1895–1975); Russian Empire; Soviet Union	Su-series fighter aircraft	
	Andrei Sychra (1773/76–1850); Russian Empire (born in Lithuania, Czech ancestry)	Russian seven-string guitar	Russian guitar
	Vladimir Syromyatnikov (1933–2006); Soviet Union; Russian Federation	Androgynous Peripheral Attach System and other spacecraft docking mechanisms	The original APAS-75 docking unit draw

=== T ===
Portrait	Person	Inventions	Image
	Andrey Ternovskiy (born 1992); Russian Federation	creator of Chatroulette, the first random webcam chat website	
	Léon Theremin (1896–1993); Russian Empire; Soviet Union; United States; Russian Federation	theremin, burglar alarm, terpsitone, Rhythmicon (first drum machine), The Thing (listening device)	Etherwave Theremin
	Andrey Tikhonov (1906–1993); Russian Empire; Soviet Union; Russian Federation	magnetotellurics	Magnetotelluric station
	Mikhail Tikhonravov (1900–1974); Russian Empire; Soviet Union	co-developer of Sputnik 1 (the first artificial satellite) together with Korolyov and Keldysh, designer of further Sputniks	Sputnik 1 replica
	Gavriil Tikhov (1875–1960); Russian Empire; Soviet Union	feathering spectrograph	Scheme of a spectrograph work
	Fedor Tokarev (1871–1968); Russian Empire; Soviet Union	TT-33 semiautomatic handgun and SVT-40 self-loading rifle (main Soviet guns of World War II)	A Soviet soldier with TT-33
	Konstantin Tsiolkovsky, (1857–1935); Russian Empire; Soviet Union	spaceflight (theory principles that led to numerous inventions, derived the Tsiolkovsky rocket equation)	Tsiolkovsky's drawings of astronaut in space
	Mikhail Tsvet (1872–1919); Russian Empire	chromatography (specifically adsorption chromatography, the first chromatography method)	A modern gas chromatography system
	Alexei Tupolev (1925–2001); Soviet Union; Russian Federation	the Tupolev Tu-144 (first supersonic passenger jet)	Tupolev Tu-144
	Andrei Tupolev (1888–1972); Russian Empire; Soviet Union	turboprop powered long-range airliner (Tupolev Tu-114), turboprop strategic bomber (Tupolev Tu-95)	Tupolev Tu-95

=== U ===
Portrait	Person	Inventions	Image
	Vladimir Utkin (1923–2000); Soviet Union; Russian Federation	railcar-launched ICBM (RT-23 Molodets), other Soviet rockets	RT-23 in the St Petersburg railway museum

=== V ===
Portrait	Person	Inventions	Image
	Vladimir Vakhmistrov (1897–1972); Russian Empire; Soviet Union	first bomber with a parasite aircraft (Zveno project)	
	Viktor Vasnetsov (1848–1926); Russian Empire; Soviet Union	budenovka military hat	
	Vladimir Veksler (1907–1966); Russian Empire; Soviet Union	synchrophasotron, co-inventor of synchrotron	A modern synchrotron scheme

=== W ===
Portrait	Person	Inventions	Image
	Paul Walden (1863–1957); Russian Empire; Germany (born in Latvia, Baltic German descent)	Walden inversion, Ethylammonium nitrate (the first room temperature ionic liquid)	Ethylammonium nitrate formula

=== Y ===
Portrait	Person	Inventions	Image
	Pavel Yablochkov (1847–1894); Russian Empire	Yablochkov candle (first commercially viable electric carbon arc lamp)	Yablochkov demonstrates his illumination in Paris, 1878
	Alexander Yakovlev (1906–1989); Russian Empire; Soviet Union	Yak-series aircraft, including Yakovlev Yak-40 (the first regional jet)	Yakovlev Yak-40
	Vladimir Yourkevitch (1885–1964); Russian Empire; France; United States	modern ship hull design	SS Normandie
	Sergei Yudin (1891–1954); Russian Empire; Soviet Union	cadaveric blood transfusion and other medical operations	World War II syringe for blood transfusion

=== Z ===
Portrait	Person	Inventions	Image
	Ludwik Łazarz Zamenhof (1859–1917); Russian Empire (Poland)	Esperanto language	Flag of Esperanto
	Yevgeny Zavoisky (1907–1976); Russian Empire; Soviet Union	EPR spectroscopy, co-developer of NMR spectroscopy	Simulated EPR spectrum of the CH_{3} radical.
	Nikolay Zelinsky (1861–1953); Russian Empire; Soviet Union	the first effective filtering activated charcoal gas mask in the world	A modern Russian gas mask
	Nikolai Zhukovsky (1847–1921); Russian Empire; Russian SFSR	an early wind tunnel, co-developer of the Tsar Tank	A modern wind tunnel
	Vladimir Zvorykin (1889–1982); Russian Empire; United States	pioneer of television technology Iconoscope, kinescope	Zworykin's draft of a UV-microscope, similar to iconoscope
	Vasily Zvyozdochkin (1876–1956); Russian Empire; Soviet Union	matryoshka doll (together with painter Sergey Malyutin)	Matryoshka doll taken apart

== See also ==
- List of Russian scientists
- Russian culture
- Timeline of Russian inventions and technology records
