= Svetlana Bessarab =

Russian politician (born 1970)

- Светлана Бессараб
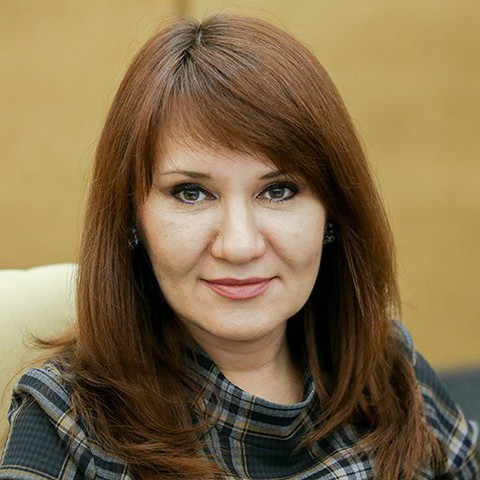

Deputy of the 8th State Duma
- Incumbent
- Assumed office 19 September 2021

Deputy of the 7th State Duma
- In office 5 October 2016 – 12 October 2021

Personal details
- Born: 7 December 1970 (age 55) Krasnodar, Russian Soviet Federative Socialist Republic, USSR
- Party: United Russia
- Education: Moscow Technical University of Communications and Informatics; Krasnodar University of the Ministry of Internal Affairs of Russia

Svetlana Viktorovna Bessarab (Russian: Светлана Викторовна Бессараб; born 7 December 1970, Krasnodar) is a Russian political figure and deputy of the 7th and 8th State Duma convocations.

In 1999 Bessarab graduated from the Moscow Technical University of Communications and Informatics, and in 2001 she received an MA degree from the Krasnodar University of the Ministry of Internal Affairs of Russia (Jurisprudence). She started her political career in 2012 when she ran for the Legislative Assembly of the Krasnodar Krai. In 2013 was appointed the chairman of the Kuban branch of the All-Russia People's Front.

Since 2016 she has served as deputy of the 7th (2016-2021) and 8th State Duma (since 2021) convocations. She represents the Krasnodar Krai.

She was one of the initiators of the law on life imprisonment for pedophiles, adopted by the State Duma and signed by Vladimir Putin at the beginning of 2022.

== Legislative activity ==
From 2016 to 2019, she served as a deputy of the State Duma of the VII convocation, co-authored 72 legislative initiatives and amendments to draft federal laws.

In 2024, Svetlana Bessarab opposed a bill that would have prohibited labor migrants from bringing their families to Russia.

== Sanctions ==
She was sanctioned by the UK government in 2022 in relation to the Russo-Ukrainian War.

On 24 March 2022, the United States Treasury sanctioned her in response to the 2022 Russian invasion of Ukraine.
