= Kataev =

Kataev (Russian: Катаев) is a Russian surname and may refer to:

- Ivan Kataev (1902–1937), Soviet writer
- Semyon Kataev (1904–1991), Soviet inventor
- Valentin Kataev (1897–1986), Soviet writer
- 3608 Kataev, a minor planet
