= Britnev =

Britnev (Russian: Бритнев) is a Russian masculine surname, its feminine counterpart is Britneva. It may refer to the following notable people:

- Maria Britneva (1921–1994), Russian-British actress
- Mikhail Britnev (1822–1889), Russian shipowner and shipbuilder
