= Brassicoraphanus =

Scientific classification
- Kingdom: Plantae
- Clade: Tracheophytes
- Clade: Angiosperms
- Clade: Eudicots
- Clade: Rosids
- Order: Brassicales
- Family: Brassicaceae
- Genus: Brassicoraphanus; Sageret

Synonyms
- × Raphanobrassica Karpech.

Hybrid genus of flowering plants

Brassicoraphanus or × Brassicoraphanus is any intergeneric hybrid between the genera Brassica (cabbages, etc.) and Raphanus (radish). The name comes from the combination of the genus names. Both diploid hybrids and allopolyploid hybrids are known and share this name.

== History ==
Early experimental crosses between species of these two genera had been sterile or nearly sterile, but large-scale experiments by Soviet agronomist Georgi Dmitrievich Karpechenko using Raphanus sativus and Brassica oleracea were remarkable because some of the plants produced hundreds of seeds. The second generation were allopolyploids, the result of gametes with doubled chromosome numbers.

- P0: Raphanus $2n_R = 18$ x, a new crop in agriculture Brassica $2n_B = 18$
- F1: sterile hybrid $n_R + n_B$
- Some of F1 spontaneously doubles their ploidy, resulting in the fertile allopolyploid $2n_R + 2n_B$

Hybrid speciation by spontaneous allopolyploidy.

As Karpechenko realized, this process had created a new species, and it could justifiably be called a new genus, and proposed the name Raphanobrassica for them, but the earlier name Brassicoraphanus has priority. Plants of this parentage are now known as radicole.

Karpechenko wanted a plant with leaves of a cabbage and the roots of a radish, but got the opposite. It is useful as fodder for livestocks, but not humans.

Two other fertile forms of Brassicoraphanus are known by the following informal names:

- The Raparadish group are allopolyploid hybrids between Raphanus sativus and Brassica rapa, used as fodder crops
- The Radicole group are allopolyploid hybrids between Raphanus sativus and Brassica oleracea, used as fodder crops
- Raphanofortii is the allopolyploid hybrid between Brassica tournefortii and Raphanus caudatus

Currently, it is thought that a great part of the flowering plants have some hybridization and polyploidization among their ancestors.

== Taxonomy ==
In 1825, Augustin Sageret published the name Brassico-raphanus. He intended it as a hybrid genus name, but at that time, for successful publication as a hybrid genus name, he should have given the parent genera in Latin, rather than French as he did. The hyphen is removed as per the International Code of Nomenclature for algae, fungi, and plants, giving Brassicoraphanus. Names using the hybrid symbol × were published later, in 1929 and 1932. In 1929, Georgii Karpechenko published the name × Raphanobrassica for the same combination of genera. As of December 2025, sources varied in the authority used and which (if either) of the two genus names they accepted.

== Bibliography ==
- Terasawa, Y. (1933). "Crossing between Brassico-raphanus and B. chinensis and Raphanus sativus". Japanese Journal of Genetics. 8 (4): 229–230. doi:10.1266/jjg.8.229.
- Lee, Soo-Seong; Lee, Sun-Ae; Yang, Jungmin; Kim, Jongkee (2010-11-27). "Developing stable progenies of ×Brassicoraphanus, an intergeneric allopolyploid between Brassica rapa and Raphanus sativus, through induced mutation using microspore culture". Theoretical and Applied Genetics. 122 (5): 885–891. doi:10.1007/s00122-010-1494-3. ISSN 0040-5752. PMID 21113703. S2CID 22306496.
