= Georgii Karpechenko =

Russian biologist (1899–1941)

Georgii Dmitrievich Karpechenko
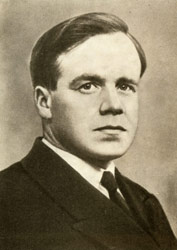
- Born: April 21 (May 3), 1899; Velsk, Vologda Governorate, Russian Empire
- Died: July 28, 1941; Firing range "Kommunarka", Moscow Oblast, USSR

Georgii Dmitrievich Karpechenko, sometimes Karpetschenko (Russian: Георгий Дмитриевич Карпеченко; 21 April 1899 – 28 July 1941) was a Russian and Soviet biologist.

G. D. Karpechenko specialized in plant cytology and created several hybrids. Among his contributions is his seminal work on allopolyploids, culminating in his creation of a fertile offspring of radishes and cabbages, the first instance of a new species obtained through polyploid speciation during experimental crossbreeding.

He worked at the Institute of Applied Botany near Leningrad, but collaborated with geneticists in other countries, notably Øjvind Winge in Denmark and Erwin Baur in Germany. He also travelled abroad to the John Innes Horticultural Institution in London. He was arrested by the NKVD under the false grounds of belonging to an alleged "anti-Soviet group" centered on the well known Russian botanist Nikolai Vavilov who was his colleague at Leningrad. He was sentenced to death and executed on July 28, 1941.

== See also ==
- List of Russian inventors
