= Mark Krivosheev =

Russian engineer and academic

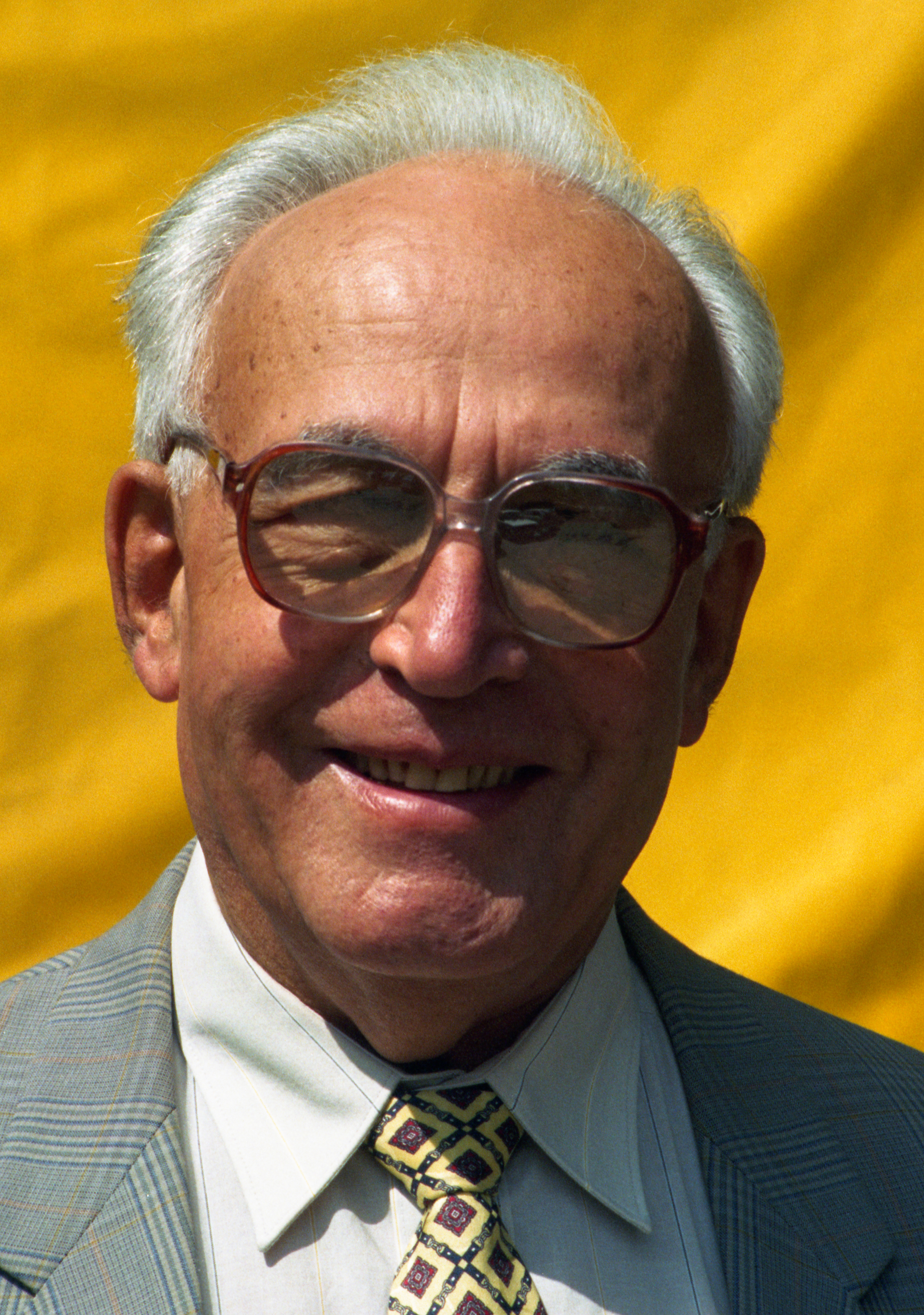
- Born: July 30, 1922; Poltava, Ukrainian SSR, Soviet Union
- Died: October 16, 2018 (aged 96)
- Resting place: Rakitki cemetery
- Education: Moscow Technical University of Communications and Informatics
- Known for: Rec. 601, Rec. 709
- Awards: Order "For Merit to the Fatherland", Order of Honour, Order of Friendship, Order of the Red Banner of Labour, Medal "For Labour Valour", Jubilee Medal "In Commemoration of the 100th Anniversary of the Birth of Vladimir Ilyich Lenin", Medal "Veteran of Labour", Jubilee Medal "300 Years of the Russian Navy", Ordre national du Mérite, State Prize of the Russian Federation, USSR State Prize, Russian Federation Presidential Certificate of Honour
- Scientific career
- Fields: Television broadcasting
- Workplaces: NIIR, Soviet Ministry of Communications, Russian Ministry of Communications

Mark Iosifovich Krivosheev (Russian: Марк Иосифович Кривошеев; July 30, 1922 – October 16, 2018) was a Soviet and Russian engineer and academic who made pioneering contributions to the development of television technology as a head of television study groups at CCIR and ITU-R. He was a key figure in establishing Rec. 601 and Rec. 709 technical standards for digital television broadcasting.

== Early life and career ==
Krivosheev was born in 1922 in the Soviet Union. As a student at the Moscow Technical University of Communications and Informatics in 1945, he participated in broadcasting the first post-war television program in Europe. In 1946, he designed a scanning unit for displaying new standard 625-line television images for the first time.

After graduating in 1946, Krivosheev joined the Moscow Television Centre, where he led the broadcast studio since 1947. On September 3, 1948, he broadcast the world's first 625-line television programme.

== Standardization work at ITU ==
Krivosheev began his decades-long involvement with the ITU's International Radio Consultative Committee (CCIR) in 1948. He was elected vice-chairman of CCIR Study Group 11 on Television in 1970 and became chairman in 1974, a position he held for about 30 years until 2000.

As Study Group 11 Chairman, Krivosheev coordinated the development of over 150 recommendations that enabled the global implementation of digital television broadcasting. Notable achievements included ITU Recommendation 601 in 1981, which established the first digital television standard, and Recommendation 709 in the 1990s, which laid out basic parameter values for the HDTV standard.

Krivosheev advocated for a "global approach" to developing internationally unified television standards rather than regional or national ones.

== Later career and legacy ==
After 2000, Krivosheev served as Honorary Chairman of the successor ITU-R Study Group 6 on Broadcasting. In 2015, he became the first Russian to receive the prestigious ITU 150 Award for his contributions over many decades.

Krivosheev authored over 30 books and 90 patents related to television technology and standards. He was honored with many awards, including the USSR State Prize and the French National Order of Merit. The Rec. 601 digital TV standard has been recognised with an Engineering Emmy award.

Krivosheev remained actively working into his 90s. He died in Moscow in October 2018 at the age of 96.
