= Moscow Technical University of Communications and Informatics =

Public technical university in Moscow, Russia

- Московский технический университет связи и информатики
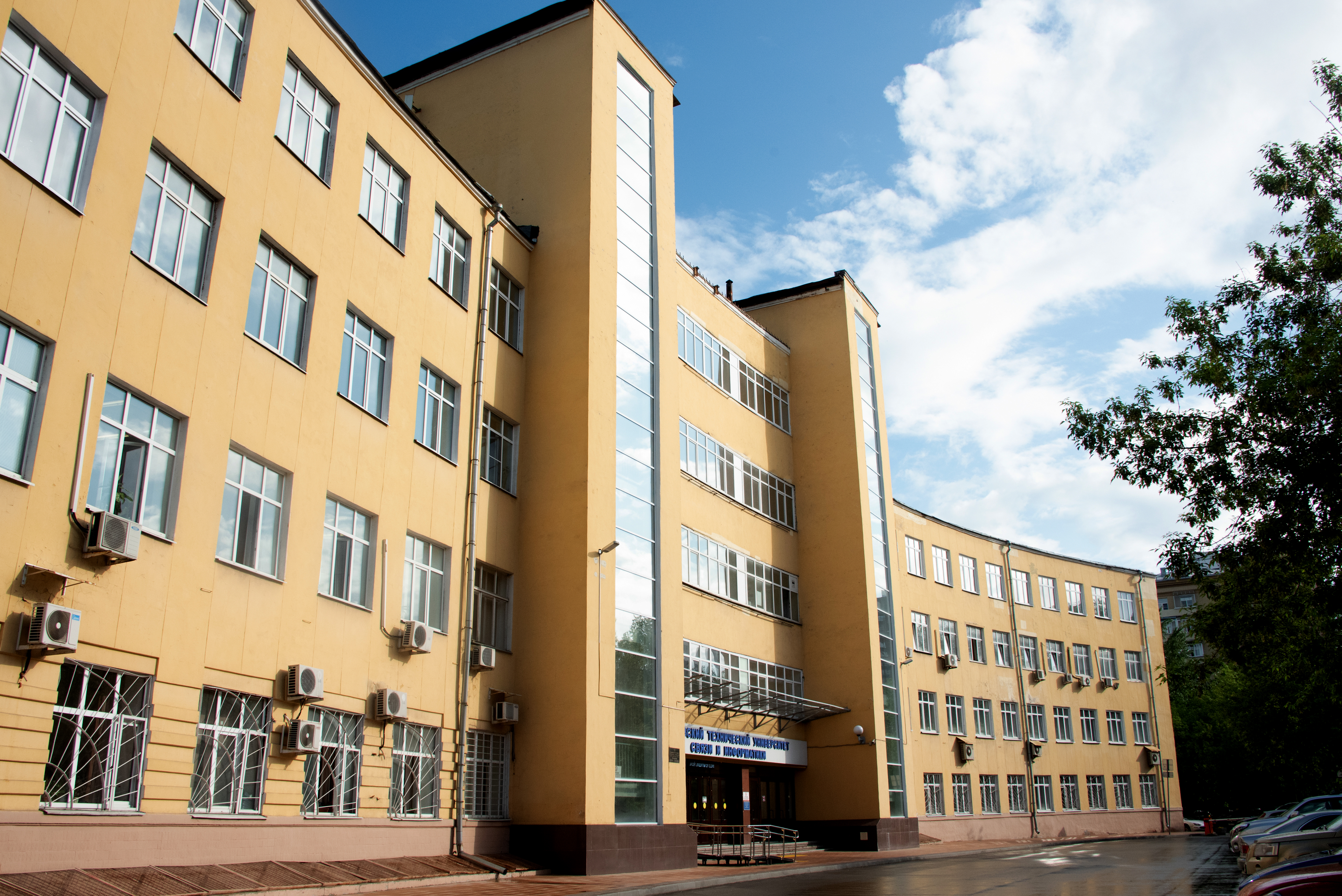
- Main building of MTUCI on Aviamotornaya Street
- Type: Public technical university
- Established: 1921; 105 years ago
- Rector: Sergey Erokhin
- Faculty: 266 (2025)
- Students: 10,355 (2025)
- Location: 8A Aviamotornaya Street, Moscow, Russia; 55.75528°N 37.71194°E
- Campus: Urban
- Website: mtuci.ru

The Moscow Technical University of Communications and Informatics (MTUCI; Russian: Московский технический университет связи и информатики, МТУСИ) is a public technical university in Moscow, Russia. It specializes in telecommunications, radio engineering, information technology and information security. Established in 1921, the university operates under the authority of the Ministry of Digital Development, Communications and Mass Media of the Russian Federation.

== History ==
=== Establishment and early development ===
The university traces its origins to communications training institutions established in Moscow in 1919 and 1920. On 9 February 1921, the Moscow Electrotechnical Institute of People's Communications, named after V. N. Podbelsky, was established to train engineers for the developing telecommunications sector.

In 1924, the institute was incorporated into the Bauman Moscow Higher Technical School as a department specializing in low-current electrical engineering. It was re-established as an independent institution in 1930. Construction of its campus on Aviamotornaya Street began in 1931.

In 1938, the institute was reorganized following its merger with the Engineering and Technical Academy of Communications named after V. N. Podbelsky, forming the Moscow Institute of Communications Engineers (MIIS).

=== Soviet period ===
Following the German invasion of the Soviet Union in 1941, the institute was evacuated to Tashkent, where it temporarily merged with the Odessa Institute of Communications Engineers. It returned to Moscow in 1943, after which its teaching facilities and laboratories were restored.

In 1946, the institution was renamed the Moscow Electrotechnical Institute of Communications (MEIS). During the following decades, its educational and research activities expanded in radio engineering, telecommunications, television and electronic communications systems.

In the 1950s, specialized research laboratories were established, while subsequent decades saw the development of television equipment, radio communication technologies, electronic switching systems and signal-processing devices.

In 1971, the institute was awarded the Order of the Red Banner of Labour for its contributions to the training of communications specialists and scientific research.

In 1988, the Moscow Institute of Communications (MIS) was established through the merger of MEIS, the All-Union Correspondence Electrotechnical Institute of Communications (VZEIS), and the Institute for Advanced Training of Managers and Specialists.

=== University status ===
On 18 January 1992, the institution was granted the status of a technical university by an order of the Russian government and adopted its present name, the Moscow Technical University of Communications and Informatics.

During the post-Soviet period, the university expanded its educational activities in computing and information technologies alongside its established telecommunications disciplines. In 2020, a Faculty of Cybernetics and Information Security was established.

== Organisation and education ==
MTUCI provides undergraduate, master's and postgraduate education in communications engineering, computer science, information security and related technical and economic disciplines. According to the 2025 government monitoring data, the university had 10,355 students enrolled in bachelor's, specialist and master's degree programmes. Its academic teaching staff numbered 266, excluding external part-time employees and personnel engaged under civil-law contracts.

The university comprises five faculties:

- Faculty of Information Technologies
- Faculty of Radio and Television
- Faculty of Network Engineering
- Faculty of Cybernetics and Information Security
- Faculty of Digital Economy and Mass Communications

The university also includes a Telecommunications College and an institute for continuing professional education.

=== Regional branches ===
MTUCI operates two regional branches offering higher education programmes:

- The North Caucasus Branch in Rostov-on-Don, originating from a regional educational and consultation centre established in 1967.
- The Volga-Vyatka Branch in Nizhny Novgorod, established in 1999.

The branches provide education in areas including telecommunications, computing and information security.

== Research ==
Research at MTUCI encompasses radio engineering, telecommunications, information transmission, signal processing, electronic systems and information technologies. Its scientific activities developed from the research conducted at the university's predecessor institutions during the Soviet period.

=== Historical research ===
The institute's research traditions developed in fields including communications theory, antenna engineering, radio-wave propagation, electroacoustics and television technology. Scientists whose work was associated with the institute at different periods included Vladimir Kotelnikov, Aleksandr Kharkevich, B. P. Aseev, G. Z. Aizenberg, S. I. Nadenenko, A. A. Pistolkors, Semyon Kataev and V. V. Shakhgildyan.

The institute developed research and engineering capabilities in television and electronic communications equipment. Kataev contributed to the development of television technology, while research associated with Shakhgildyan included phase-locked-loop systems and radio-transmitting equipment.

Research groups at MEIS also worked on magnetic recording, electroacoustic systems, electronic switching and the automation of telecommunications networks. Some of the equipment developed at the institute was subsequently manufactured and used by communications organizations.

=== Contemporary research ===
The university's research activities include radio signal processing, satellite communications and navigation, information security, digital broadcasting and advanced telecommunications systems.

In 2025, MTUCI was named among the scientific and educational institutions expected to collaborate with the Skolkovo Institute of Science and Technology on a three-year project concerning 5G Advanced technologies and research supporting the future development of 6G networks.

Research in quantum communications has included studies of electromagnetic interference affecting quantum cryptographic communication systems. In 2026, MTUCI researchers published an experimental study of the electromagnetic compatibility of a quantum cryptographic system.

== International cooperation ==
MTUCI has participated in the activities of the International Telecommunication Union (ITU) since 2007, including its Telecommunication Development Sector (ITU-D) and expert and study groups.

From 2015 to 2018, the university was included in the ITU Centres of Excellence network for the Commonwealth of Independent States region. Its designated areas included cybersecurity and ICT applications and services.

The university has also been involved in educational cooperation within the Regional Commonwealth in the Field of Communications, which coordinates activities among telecommunications administrations and educational institutions in the region.

MTUCI maintains academic cooperation with foreign universities and telecommunications organizations. In June 2025, the university signed 12 memoranda of understanding with organizations from Ethiopia, Cuba, Tajikistan, Tanzania, Vietnam and Belarus at a digital forum in Nizhny Novgorod. The agreements addressed educational cooperation, research and academic exchanges.

In February 2026, MTUCI and Kazakhstan's ALT University signed an agreement on cooperation in education and research related to information and communications technologies.

== Educational and research facilities ==
MTUCI operates specialized laboratories and training facilities in telecommunications, computing, cybersecurity, robotics and quantum technologies.

Selected facilities include:

- A quantum technology centre supporting education and research in quantum communications and photonics.
- An industrial robotics laboratory equipped with KUKA robotic manipulators and industrial automation equipment.
- A cybersecurity training range using information-security training systems, including quantum key distribution equipment.
- The Luban Workshop, a Russian-Chinese educational facility associated with training in telecommunications and fifth-generation mobile network technologies.

The university also houses a Museum of the History of Telecommunications. Its collections include historical computing equipment, telephone exchanges, maritime and military communications equipment, television technology and sound-recording devices dating from the late nineteenth to the mid-twentieth century.

== Notable alumni ==
- Mark Krivosheev (1922–2018) – Soviet and Russian television engineer and researcher who contributed to the development and international standardization of digital and high-definition television. He graduated from the Moscow Institute of Communications Engineers in 1946 and later worked at the Moscow Television Centre and the Research Institute of Radio.
- Aleksandr Feklisov (1914–2007) – Soviet intelligence officer and Hero of the Russian Federation. He graduated from the institute's radio faculty in 1939 and subsequently served in Soviet intelligence operations in the United States and the United Kingdom.
- Vasily Shamshin (1926–2009) – Soviet communications engineer and Minister of Communications of the Soviet Union from 1980 to 1989. He studied at the Moscow Electrotechnical Institute of Communications.
- Vladimir Bulgak (born 1941) – Russian engineer, politician and former Minister of Communications. He graduated from the Moscow Electrotechnical Institute of Communications in 1963 and later served as Deputy Prime Minister of Russia.
