= Dmitri Z. Garbuzov =

Russian-born American inventor

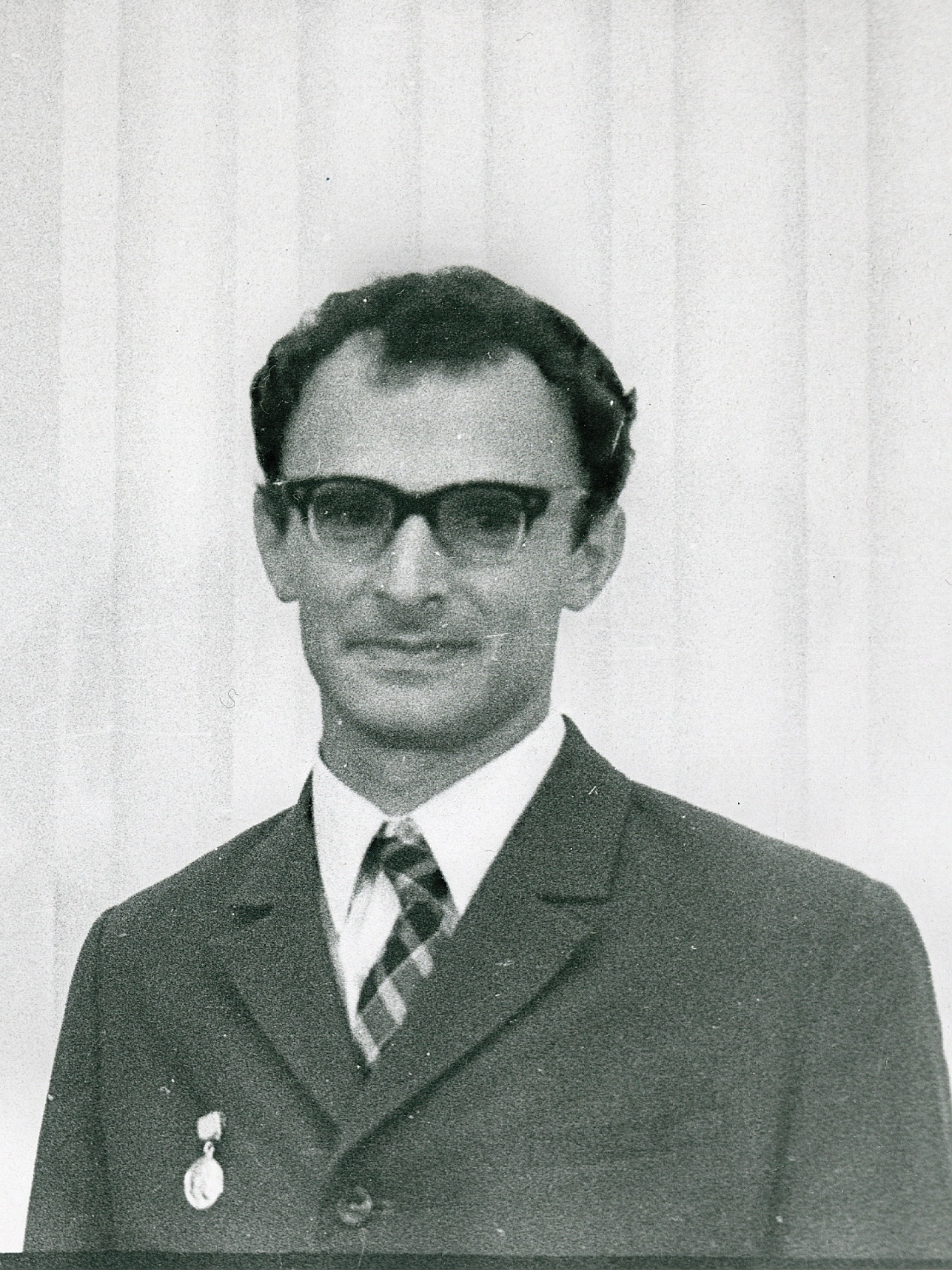
- Dmitri Garbuzov Receiving the Lenin Prize in Russia
- Born: October 27, 1940; Sverdlovsk, RSFSR, Soviet Union
- Died: August 20, 2006 (aged 65); Princeton, New Jersey, United States
- Known for: Practical (Room temperature, high efficiency, and high power) diode lasers at a variety of wavelengths from visible to mid-infrared
- Awards: Lenin Prize (1972); State Prize (1987); Elected to the Russian Academy of Sciences (1991); Humboldt Award (1992)
- Scientific career
- Workplaces: Ioffe Physico-Technical Institute (St. Petersburg, Russia); in latter years Princeton University (Princeton, New Jersey), Sarnoff Corporation (Princeton, New Jersey) (now integrated into SRI International), and Princeton Lightwave, Inc. (Cranbury, NJ)

Dmitri Z. Garbuzov (October 27, 1940, Sverdlovsk (Yekaterinburg) – August 20, 2006, Princeton, New Jersey) was one of the pioneers and inventors of room-temperature continuous-wave-operating diode lasers and high-power diode lasers.

The first room-temperature, continuous-wave diode lasers were successfully invented, developed, and almost simultaneously demonstrated at the Ioffe Physico-Technical Institute in Leningrad, Russia, by a team including Garbuzov and Zhores Alferov (winner of the 2000 Nobel Prize for Physics), and by the competing team of I. Hayashi and M. Panish at Bell Telephone Laboratories in Murray Hill, New Jersey. Both teams attained this accomplishment in 1970. Garbuzov was also responsible for the development of practical high-power, high-efficiency, diode lasers at a variety of wavelength bands from visible to mid-infrared wavelengths.

Following perestroika, Garbuzov, who had served as an accomplished and respected scientist and manager within the Soviet scientific research system, established a research group in the West which employed multiple Russian émigré scientists and simultaneously contributed to three American for-profit enterprises.

== Personal life ==
Dmitri Zalmanovitch Garbuzov was born in Sverdlovsk, Russia, in 1940. His father, Zalman Garbuzov, was a prominent engineer. His mother was Natalia Polivoda. He married Galina Minina and they have two children, Alina and Dmitri.

Garbuzov succumbed to cancer, diagnosed at an advanced stage, in August 2006 at the age of 65 at his home in Princeton, New Jersey.

== Early career ==
In 1962 Dmitri graduated from the Department of Physics of Leningrad State University. In 1964, Dmitri joined the group of Zhores Alferov at Ioffe Physical-Technical Institute of the Russian Academy of Sciences in Leningrad. At the time, Alferov's team was among the very few research groups in the world that studied heterojunctions in semiconductors. In 2000, Zhores Alferov and Herbert Kroemer were awarded the Nobel Prize for their pioneering work.

The achievement of the first 300 ºK continuous-wave diode laser was reported in Investigation of the influence of the AlGaAs-GaAs heterostructure parameters on the laser threshold current and the realization of the continuous emission at the room temperature

Dmitri Garbuzov received his Ph.D. in 1968, and Doctor of Science degree in 1979. In the Russian system, the Doctor of Science is the second doctoral degree which is awarded to suitable candidates who can lead research.

== Room-temperature diode laser ==
=== Background ===
The 1970 demonstration of the first room-temperature diode laser crowned years of scientific and technological research developments involving optical semiconductors. These accomplishments parallel, but lag, the microelectronics revolution that started with the transistor, first demonstrated in 1947 (leading to the displacement of vacuum tube electronics in the marketplace). Although the laser had already been invented by Charles Hard Townes and Arthur Leonard Schawlow, separately by Gordon Gould, and separately in the Soviet Union by Aleksandr Prokhorov, there was no practical laser "chip" which would make the laser a commodity, one that today is displacing more inefficient lasers (those based on gas discharge or flashlamp designs) in the consumer, industrial, medical, and government marketplaces.

Shortly after the accomplishments attributed to Townes and Schawlow, the possibility of lasing in a semiconductor device was recognized. The key major accomplishment was the 1962 observation of nearly 100% internal efficiency in the conversion of electron-hole pairs to photons in GaAs semiconductor devices at MIT Lincoln Laboratory, RCA Laboratories, and Texas Instruments, Inc., shortly thereafter followed by the demonstration of the first diode laser by General Electric and IBM. The new semiconductor laser devices operated only at cryogenic temperatures (typically that of liquid nitrogen, that is, at 77K or –196 °C). For practical use, it would be necessary to demonstrate diode laser action, continuous-wave, at room temperature.

=== Invention of room-temperature diode laser ===
The invention of the first room-temperature diode laser in the Soviet Union occurred during a climate of intense Cold War competition and secrecy, albeit with sporadic scientific contacts at international conferences and during politically sanctioned international visits. The question of primacy of the invention was debated over the years. Today, however, semiconductor laser scientists agree that the key design concept that enabled the room-temperature diode laser, namely the double-heterostructure design, was invented in the Soviet Union in 1964 by Rudolf F. Kazarinov and Zhores Alferov, as recorded in a Russian patent application filed that year. For that invention and several other seminal contributions to the semiconductor lasers Rudolf F. Kazarinov won the 1998 Quantum Electronics Award of the IEEE Photonics Society (see below at References).

While the Nobel Prize committee satisfied itself that the Russian team including Dmitri Z. Garbuzov, led by Zhores Alferov, reached continuous-wave room-temperature lasing before the competing team of Hayashi and Panish at Bell Labs, there continues to be discussion on this point, and the matter may never perfectly be resolved.

Today, as a result of the accomplishments of Garbuzov and other scientists, diode lasers continue to transform the laser into a widely available engineered component. Laser chips are incorporated in many products that today are taken for granted, such as CDs, DVDs, laser printers, and fiberoptic communications. Other devices relying on semiconductor laser chip technology include illumination, ranging, and spectroscopic sensing systems of many types, and laser welding, cutting, and machining tools such as those now widely adopted by automobile manufacturers. In addition, the same principles first developed by Garbuzov and Alferov underlie the ongoing revolution in gallium nitride-based solid-state lighting with high-quality high-efficiency phosphor-LED luminaires now available to consumers at affordable prices.

== Later years in Russia ==
In subsequent years, Garbuzov developed the highest-power diode lasers at wavelengths from 0.8 to 2.7 μm, introducing a new and revolutionary laser design to accomplish this, and made many contributions to new laser devices and businesses that produced them.

In 1979, Garbuzov became head of the Semiconductor Luminescence and Injection Emitters Laboratory at the A.F. Ioffe Physical Technical Institute. Heterojunctions of quaternary solid solutions of InGaAsP/InP were investigated under his leadership. Lasers based on such structures are the basis of today's optical communications.

He led research on re-radiation effects in double heterojunctions. His group at the Ioffe Institute established almost 100% external efficiency of luminescence in GaAlAs heterostructures. This gave birth to another practical application – a new class of semiconductor alphanumeric displays. In 1987, Garbuzov and colleagues were awarded the State Prize for this achievement, the second highest civilian award in the former Soviet Union.

Aluminum-free diode heterostructure lasers became the next step in his scientific life. He suggested and developed lasers with wavelengths of 0.75-1.0 μm, including those of visible (red) wavelengths.

In 1991 Garbuzov became a corresponding member of the Russian Academy of Sciences.

== Berlin ==
After the collapse of the Soviet Union, Garbuzov received the Humboldt Award for his work on Al-free diode lasers, and with it financial support for one year of work in Germany. He used the Award for an extended visit in 1992 to conduct research on InAlGaAs/InGaAs distributed feedback lasers at Dieter Bimberg’s laboratory at Technische Universität Berlin.

== United States ==
=== Princeton University and Sarnoff Corporation ===
In 1994, following a year's visit with the group of Manijeh Razeghi at Northwestern University in Evanston, Illinois, he decided to join both Princeton University and Sarnoff Corporation (formerly RCA Laboratories, and today integrated as part of parent company SRI International), in Princeton, New Jersey. In 1997 he was joined by long-time collaborator Viktor B. Khalfin, a semiconductor physics theorist.

Garbuzov continued to advance the performance of semiconductor devices at both institutions and later became a senior member of technical staff at Sarnoff Corporation, where he remained until May 2000. At Sarnoff, Garbuzov worked on antimonide-based lasers demonstrating record wavelengths of 2.7 μm. At the same time, he made a significant impact in high-power diode lasers and their heterostructures by introducing the "broadened waveguide," a concept which now serves as a basis for the entire industry producing high-power lasers for industrial applications (U.S. Patent 5,818,860).

=== Princeton Lightwave ===
In 2000, Garbuzov became one of the founders of Princeton Lightwave Inc., where he was vice president of research, where he continued his work on high-power stripe lasers. Garbuzov's work led to the acquisition of a portion of PLI by the TRUMPF Group, a manufacturer of industrial laser metal-forming and manufacturing equipment.

== Citations ==
- H. Lee, P.K. York, R.J. Menna, R.U. Martinelli, D.Z. Garbuzov, S.Y. Narayan, and J.C. Connolly, Room-temperature 2.78 μm AlGaAsSb/InGaAsSb quantum-well lasers, Applied Physics Letters volume 66, issue 15, page 1942,(1995)
- D.Z. Garbuzov et al."2.3-2.7 room temperature CW operation of InGaAsSb/AlGaAsSb broad waveguide SCH-QW diode lasers". IEEE Photon. Technology Letters v. 11 pp. 794–796, (1999).
- G. Gu, D.Z. Garbuzov, P.E. Burrows, S. Venkatesh, S.R. Forrest, and M.E. Thompson, High-external-quantum-efficiency organic light-emitting devices, Optics Letters volume 22, page 396.
- V. Bulović, V.B. Khalfin, G. Gu, P.E. Burrows, D.Z. Garbuzov, S.R. Forrest Weak microcavity effects in organic light-emitting devices, Physical Review B volume 58, page 3730.
- L.J. Mawst, A. Bhattacharya, J. Lopez, D. Botez, D. Z. Garbuzov, L. DiMarco, J. C. Connolly, M. Jansen, F. Fang, and R.F. Nabiev,.8 W continuous wave front-facet power from broad-waveguide Al-free 980 nm diode lasers, Applied Physics Letters volume 69, page 1532.

== U.S. patents ==
Patent Number	Title
7,084,444	Method and apparatus for improving efficiency in opto-electronic radiation source devices
6,650,671	Semiconductor diode lasers with improved beam divergence
6,650,045	Displays having mesa pixel configuration
6,600,764	High-power single-mode semiconductor laser
6,556,611	Wide stripe distributed Bragg reflector lasers with improved angular and spectral characteristics
6,459,715	Master-oscillator grating coupled power amplifier with angled amplifier section
6,404,125	Method and apparatus for performing wavelength-conversion using phosphors with light-emitting diodes
6,366,018	Apparatus for performing wavelength-conversion using phosphors with light-emitting diodes
6,330,263	Laser diode having separated, highly strained quantum wells
6,301,279	Semiconductor diode lasers with thermal sensor control of the active region temperature
6,133,520	Heterojunction thermophotovoltaic cell
6,125,226	Light-emitting devices having high brightness
6,091,195	Displays having mesa pixel configuration
6,046,543	High reliability, high efficiency, integratable organic light-emitting devices and methods of producing same
6,005,252	Method and apparatus for measuring film spectral properties
5,986,268	Organic luminescent coating for light detectors
5,874,803	Light-emitting device with stack of OLEDS and phosphor downconverter
5,834,893	High efficiency organic light-emitting devices with light directing structures
5,818,860	High-power semiconductor laser diode

== Awards and prizes ==
The Nobel Prize Committee awarded the 2000 Nobel Prize for Physics to Zhores Alferov as the leader of the Soviet team to discover and invent the room-temperature diode laser.

In 1972, Dr. Garbuzov, together with Dr. Alferov and other colleagues, was awarded the Lenin Prize, the highest civilian award in the Soviet Union of that era. The Lenin Prize's citation was "Fundamental Research of Heterojunctions in Semiconductors and Development of Novel Devices on their Bases."

Garbuzov received, with his team, the 1987 State Prize, the second highest prize awarded within the Soviet Union.

In 1991 Garbuzov was honored by becoming a member of the Russian Academy of Sciences.

Garbuzov received the Humboldt Prize in 1992.

== See also ==
- List of Russian inventors

== Sources ==
- https://web.archive.org/web/20160819234546/http://www.photonicssociety.org/award-winners/Quantum%20Electronics%20Award
