= Aleksandr Porokhovschikov =

Russian inventor

- Александр Александрович Пороховщиков
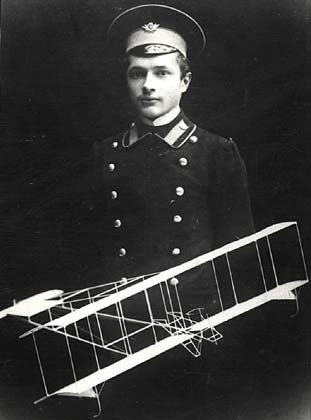
- Porokhovschikov with an aircraft model
- Born: July 8, 1892; Saint Petersburg, Russia
- Died: July 27, 1941 (aged 49); Moscow
- Resting place: Moscow
- Engineering career
- Discipline: Military engineering
- Significant design: Vezdekhod

Aleksandr Aleksandrovich Porokhovschikov (Russian: Александр Александрович Пороховщиков) (July 8, 1892 – July 27, 1941) was a Russian and Soviet military engineer, tank and aircraft inventor from Saint Petersburg, known mostly for the development of Vezdekhod, the world's first tank (resembling the modern tankette) in 1914–1915. Vezdekhod means 'he who goes anywhere' or 'all-terrain vehicle'. Vezdekhod was also the first caterpillar amphibious all-terrain vehicle. Subsequently, Porokhovschikov added wheels to his tank for steering, making it also the first tank design to combine caterpillar and wheel forms of movement. However, the steering was ineffectual, and his design rejected.

As a student, he designed his first aircraft in 1909. Later in 1911, he established a workshop that manufactured simple biplanes. His personal first flight took place at the Zolitude airstrip on the outskirts of Riga. In 1914, he constructed the world's first twin-tail aircraft. The second version of the plane, named Bi-Kok, had another invention – caterpillar-type landing gear. He was offered to license the manufacturing of his type aircraft at the Fyodor Tereschenko's factory in Kiev, but Porokhovschikov refused and returned from Petrograd to Riga.

Before WWI he offered to create an air defence system for the government across the Baltic coasts of Russia that would encompass surveillance posts interlinked with airfields having fighter planes on duty.

By the time of the Russian Revolution in 1917, he manufactured various aircraft at his workshop in Petrograd. While all the factories were nationalized from the former owners, Porokhovschikov himself offered his facilities for public ownership. In 1918 he graduated as a military pilot and joined the Red Army Air Force to participate in the Civil War against the monarchists and armed foreign intervention.

After the war Porokhovschikov headed various air force-related bodies and continued aircraft engineering. Between 1919 and 1923, training biplanes of his design, P-IV bis, P-IV 2bis, and P-VI bis, were produced. In 1924 he retired and opened a private design bureau offering engineering services and proposing new aircraft designs to the government.

During his first exile in Solovki that started in 1927, he designed hydraulic equipment for the Belomorkanal, a semi-artificial waterway system connecting the White Sea to the Baltic Sea. After exile, he continued to hold the same job in Moscow, working for different state institutions.

In 1940, he was falsely accused of espionage and anti-communist propaganda, and was executed in Moscow one year later. Although officially he was rehabilitated only in late 1955, by the late 1940s he was mentioned in the Soviet press in a positive context.

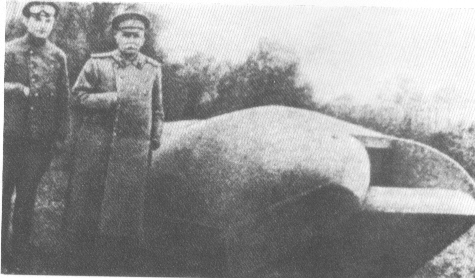
Vezdekhod tank in 1915

== See also ==
- List of Russian inventors
