= Leonty Shamshurenkov =

Leonty Luk'yanovich Shamshurenkov
- Леонтий Лукьянович Шамшуренков
- Born: 1687; Bolshepolskaya village, Yaransky Uyezd
- Died: 1758 (aged 70–71)
- Occupation: Inventor

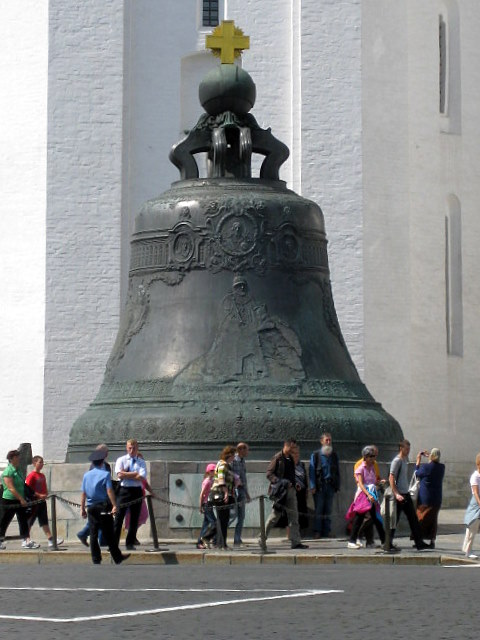
The Tsar Bell inside the Moscow Kremlin

Leonty Luk'yanovich Shamshurenkov (Russian: Леонтий Лукьянович Шамшуренков) (1687–1758) was a self-taught Russian inventor of peasant origin, who designed a device for lifting the Tsar Bell onto a bell-tower, constructed in 1752 the first self-propelling or self-running carriage (may be regarded as precursor to both quadrocycle and automobile) and proposed projects of an original odometer and self-propelling sledge.

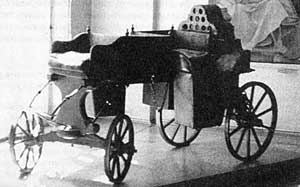
A later reconstruction of Shamshurenkov's "self-running" carriage

== See also ==
- List of Russian inventors
