= Sergei Ivanovich Mosin =

Russian Major General, rifle designer (1849–1902)

- Серге́й Ива́нович Мо́син
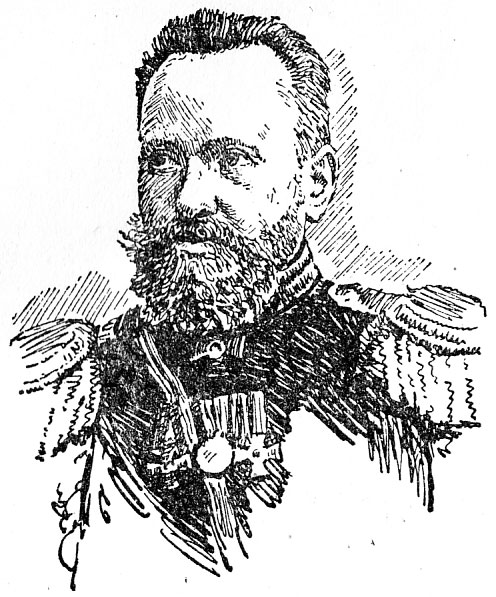
- Born: Sergei Ivanovich Mosin; April 14, 1849; Ramon, Voronezh Governorate, Russian Empire
- Died: February 8, 1902 (aged 52); Sestroretsk, Russian Empire
- Spouse: Varvara Nikolayevna Arsenyeva
- Military career
- Allegiance: Russian Empire
- Rank: Major General
- Known for: Mosin Nagant rifle 7.62×54mmR rifle cartridges

Sergei Ivanovich Mosin (Russian: Серге́й Ива́нович Мо́син, 14 April [O.S. 2 April] 1849 - February 8, 1902) was a Russian Major General, engineer, and the main contributor to the design of the 3-line rifle, Model 1891 (Russian: "трёхлинейная винтовка образца 1891 года"), colloquially known as the Mosin–Nagant.

== Early life ==
Mosin was born in Ramon, in the Voronezh Governorate of the Russian Empire in 1849. He entered into a military academy at age 12 where he excelled as a young officer. In 1867, he entered the Alexandrovskoye Military High School in Moscow. Upon leaving Alexandrovskoye in 1870, he decided to go to the artillery branch and transferred to the Mikhailovskoye Artillery Academy. He graduated in 1875 and transferred to the Tula Arsenal where he became the head of the machining division.

== Mosin–Nagant ==
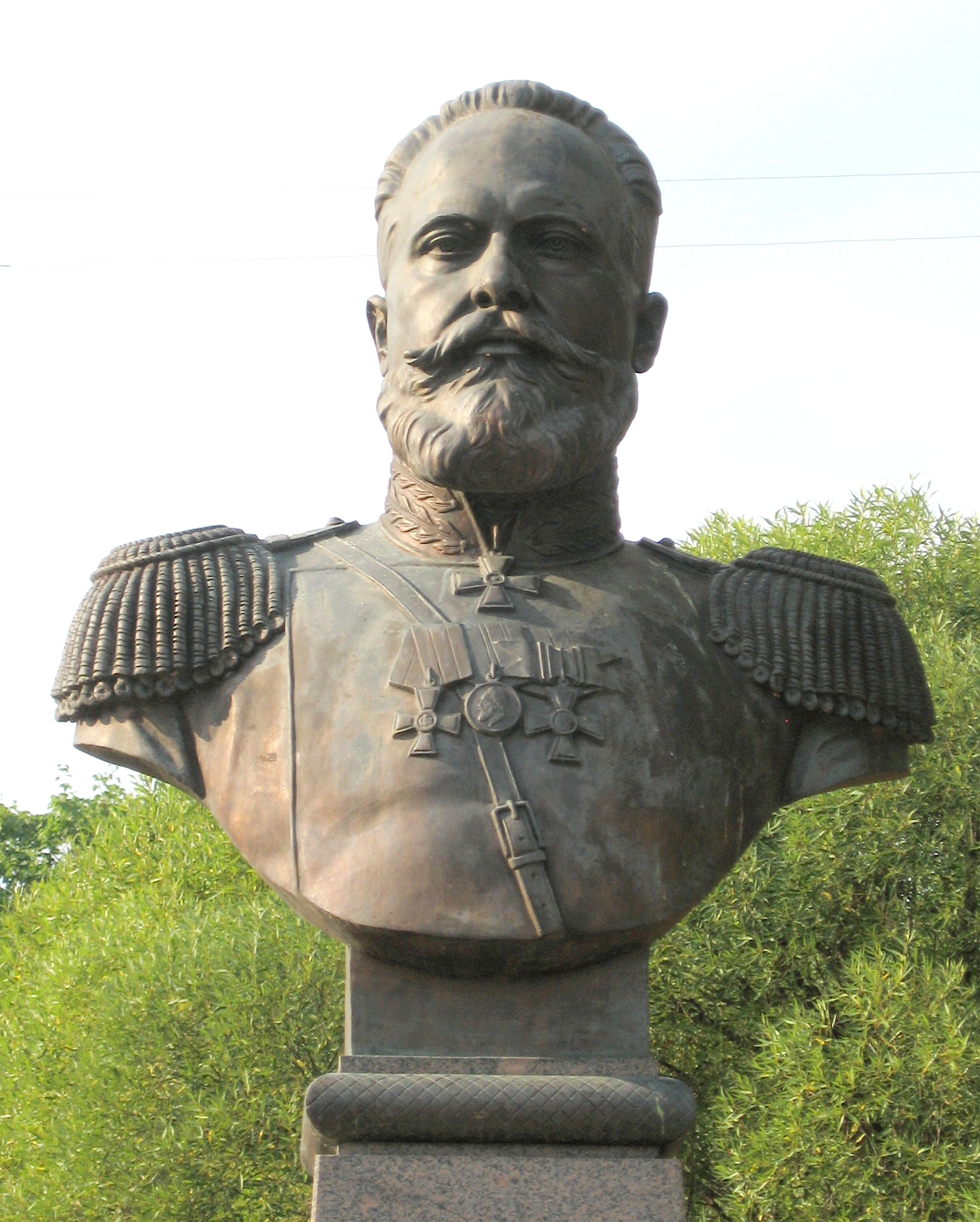
Monument to Mosin in Sestroretsk, Russia.

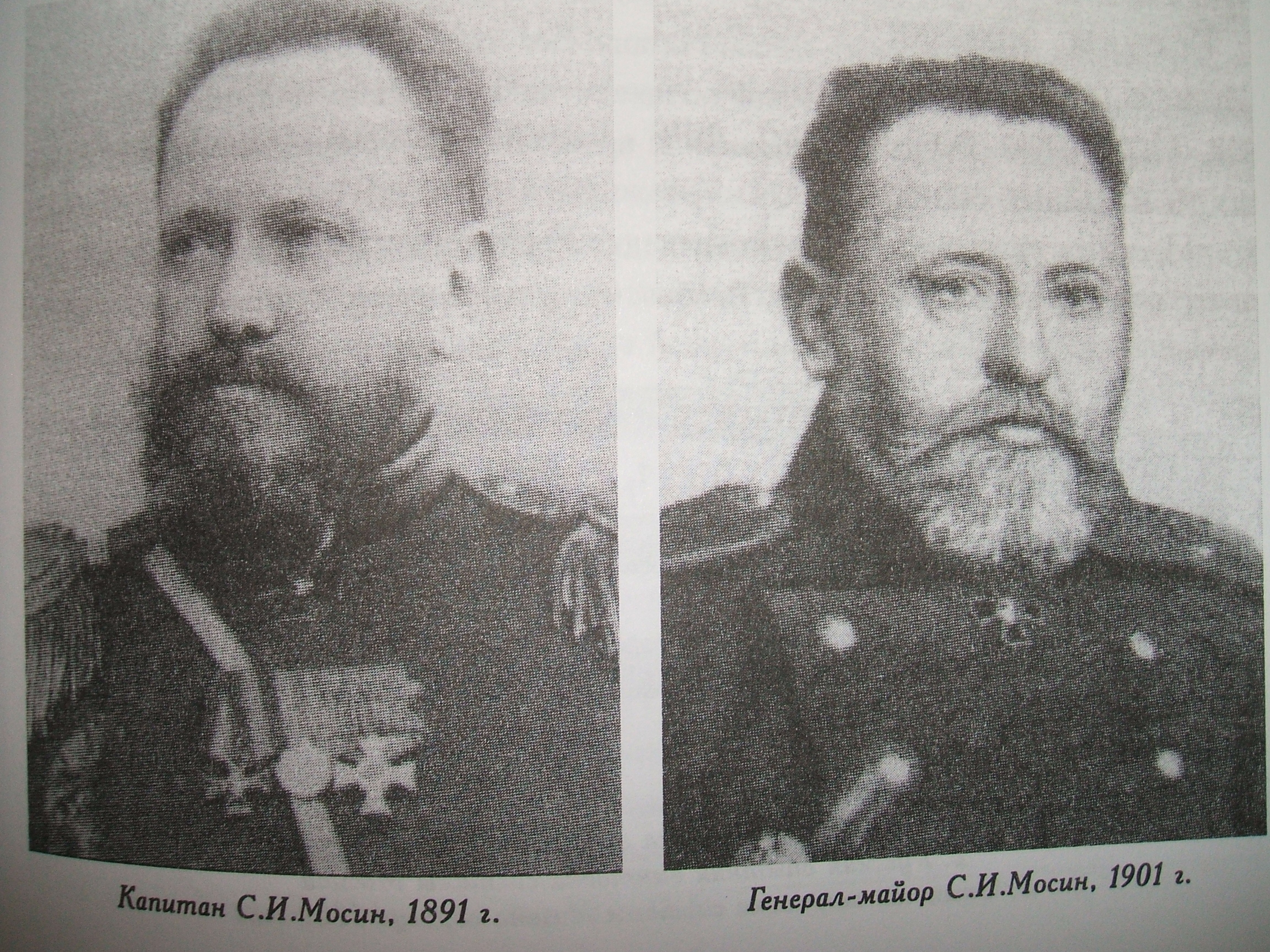
Sergei Mosin in 1891 (left) and in 1901 (right)

It was at Tula where Mosin began his career as a weapons designer by first making improvements to the Berdan II and later collaborating with Nagant to design the Rifle of Three Lines of the Year 1891. Some details in Mosin's rifle were borrowed from Léon Nagant's design. One such detail is the attachment of the magazine spring to the magazine base plate. In Mosin's original design the spring was not attached to the base plate and, according to the commission, could be lost during cleaning. Another detail is the form of the clip that could hold five cartridges to be loaded simultaneously into the magazine. Another detail is the form of the "interrupter", a specially designed part within the receiver, which helps prevent double feeding. The initial rifle proposed by Mosin lacked an interrupter, leading to numerous failures to feed. This detail was introduced in the rifle borrowing from Nagant's rifle.

== Later life and death ==
Mosin eventually rose to the rank of Major General and was appointed as the director of the Sestroretsk arsenal. He died on February 8, 1902, and was buried in Sestroretskoye Cemetery in St. Petersburg Sestroretsk.

== See also ==
- List of Russian inventors
