= Augustin Sageret =

French botanist

Augustin Sageret (27 July 1763 – 23 March 1851) was a French botanist.

In 1826, Sageret carried out an experiment that involved hybridizing a muskmelon with a cantaloupe. He has been described as a precursor to Gregor Mendel.

== Biography ==
He participated in the founding of the National Horticultural Society of France and was a member of the Académie d'Agriculture. He conducted agronomic research in Lorris (Loiret), where he settled around 1819. He is particularly interested in hybridization.
