= Nestor Genko =

Russian scientist

Nestor Karlovich Genko
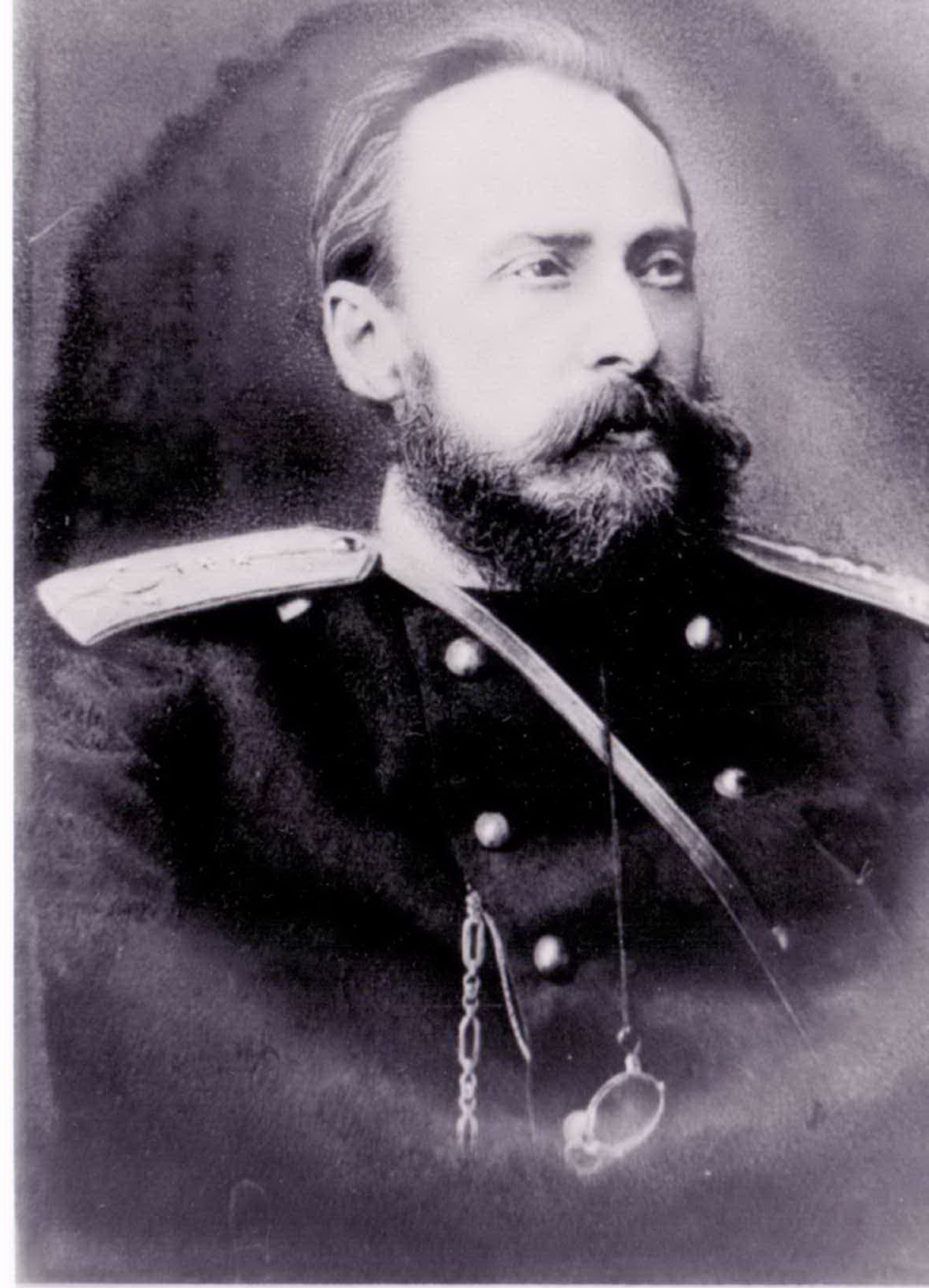
- Nestor Genko
- Born: 3 February 1839; Tadayken, Kurland Governorate, Russian Empire
- Died: 10 February 1904 (aged 65); Menton, France
- Citizenship: Russian
- Known for: Genko Forest Belt
- Spouse: Maria Aleksandrovna née von Harff (1861–1909)
- Children: 10 children (see list)
- Awards: Order of Saint Stanislaus 1st degree Order of St. Vladimir 3rd degree Order of St. Anna 2nd degree with swords (for bravery during the Russo-Turkish War of 1877–78 and crossing of the Balkans); Commemorative medal of the Russo-Turkish War of 1877–78; Medal for the organisation of civil government in Bulgaria; Medal for the commemoration of the reign of Tsar Alexander III; Medal for the 100 years of Imperial Estates
- Scientific career
- Fields: Forestry
- Institutions: Administration of Imperial Estates; Saint Petersburg Institute of Forestry and Surveying

Nestor Karlovich Genko (or Henko, Russian: Нестор Карлович Генко) January 22 (February 3) 1839 in the Grodno Governorate, province of Kurland, Russian Empire – January, 28 (February 10) 1904 in Menton, France), was a scientist in the field of forestry, known for creation of the world's first major watershed protection forest belt system, the Genko Forest Belt, located in the east of Ulyanovsk Oblast. He was also a hero of the Russo-Turkish War of 1877–78.

== The Genko family ==
The first recorded mention of the Genko family dates to the 16th century when a member of a patrician family of German origins in Thorn, Poland, participated in wars against the Turks as a lieutenant of cavalry. For bravery and leadership Ian Genko was awarded nobility by the Reichstag in 1683. This hereditary nobility was confirmed to Ivan Iossevitch von Genko and his descendants by the Senate of the Russian Empire in 1848. His great-grandson Nestor Karlovich Genko was born on January 22 (February 3) 1839 in the estate Tadayken (province of Kurland, actually in Latvia), son of Karl Georgevitch von Genko, supervisor of the estate of the Duke of Wurttemberg, and of Wilhelmina Mariana (née Schwander).

== Biography ==
=== Education ===
In 1849 Genko entered the elementary school of Tukums, then the grammar school of Mittau (now Yelgava), then studied at the Saint Petersburg Institute of Forestry and Surveying, from which he graduated in 1862 as second lieutenant of the Forest Administration.

=== Service in the Forest Administration ===
Genko began his professional activities as inspector in the province of Vilnius in Bialowieza, in 1862 in the Orenburg Governorate and in 1863 in the Vyatka province for the management of naval construction forests. For his outstanding contribution, in 1864, Genko was sent to Prussia for one year. Back to Russia he worked in the Vilnius and Kaluga Governorates. In 1866 he was appointed to be junior forest warden of the Tellerman Forest which included the Shipov Forest. In 1872 this forest was declared to be a separate forest of the first category and Genko was appointed as its warden. He remained there until 1876. During the 10 years he was there, he installed new oak plantations and built paved roads in difficult terrain.

=== Service in the Russo-Turkish War ===
In 1876, Genko ostensibly for "reason of health", left the Forest Administration. In 1877 he graduated from the St Petersburg infantry school with the rank of staff captain and was assigned to the Kostroma Infantry Regiment. As a company commander he participated in the battles of Tachkisen, Komartsov and the crossing of the Balkans. Upon the end of the war, he remained in Bulgaria first as chief of the Bourgas and Demoti district, then as police commander of Burgas.

=== Service in the administration of the Imperial Estates ===
In 1880 Genko returned to forestry activities as a junior scientist forester of the Imperial Estates Administration where there was less bureaucracy and red tape. This is the most productive part of his life as reported by his colleagues. He developed new instructions (1883, 1893), and carried out, on a massive scale, forest inventory and organised their exploitation. Of particular importance is the work in Bielowieza Forest, where on the basis of theoretical research, he applied for the first time, a definition of the forest area (over 100 thousands hectares) by different type of forests. This fundamental work is still of important value today. Another very important catalogue of Russian European forests, with numerous tables and maps was issued. It set an alarm concerning Russian forests, showing deforestation and poor management. For the first time he proposed an original method for gradual cuts in the pine forests, based on studies of the particularities of renewal of pine trees in various soil and geographical conditions.

The long lasting activity of Genko in the area of steppe protective afforestation (1884-1904) ranks him as a pioneer in this field of forestry.

The aim of these protective forest bands was to increase the yield of an important area of steppe territory belonging to the Imperial Estates. It was planned to repopulate these areas, providing the inhabitants with water (ponds) and forest. These plantations were intended also to ease the harsh climate of the steppes, the pernicious action of hot winds and droughts, as well as preventing formation of ravines. In the arid steppes of the Samara, Volgograd and Voronezh governorates, some 13 thousand hectares of protective forest belts were planted by 1902. These forest belts were known as "Genko Forests". For economic consideration, the width of the forest belts was to be 400 to 600 meters. These strips were located mainly on "black earth" along the watersheds, which in the steppes are the most suitable for a forest. The primary orientation was from southwest to northeast, that is, perpendicular to the predominant summer dry winds.

The forests which have changed the climate of the "beyond the Volga" region are now over 100 years old, but the condition of the remaining plantations testify the correctness of Genko's theories regarding the questions of steppe protective afforestation. Time has decided the scientific disputes between Genko and G. N. Vysotskii, who was a vigorous opponent of the massive afforestation in the steppe, and who gave a very negative forecast to their future

The 1903 all-Russia Congress of Forest Management took place in Riga and Genko attended and participated in the debates. Everyone realized that this was his "swan song". The same year, on the occasion of the 100th anniversary of the Saint Petersburg Imperial Institute of Forestry, Genko was elected an honorary member of the institute, but due to his health problems could not attend the celebrations.

In December 1903, he was released for medical treatment in Menton (southern France) where he died on January 28, 1904, and was buried there.

=== Family ===
After Genko's death a large family remained which consisted of his widow Maria Aleksandrovna (née von Harff: 1861–1909) and ten children. His eldest son Nestor (1881-1937) graduated from the historical-philological faculty of Saint Petersburg University and was known as ethnographer and regional historian. Cyril (1889-1937) became a professor of the German language and geography. Evgeniy (1892-1937) became a surveyor and a builder. All three were shot by the Bolsheviks in 1937, and posthumously rehabilitated. Peter (1886-1913) became a forester and committed suicide. Alexander (1894-?) left the Faculty of Oriental Languages of Saint Petersburg University, graduated from the Vladimir Military Academy and later joined the White Army: his further destiny is unknown. Anatoly (1896-1941) became a famous linguist, specializing in Caucasian languages, a historian and ethnographer. He was arrested twice and died in jail. Genko's daughters, Ludmilla (1883-1929), Maria (1887-1920), Tatiana (1891-1921) died in the 1920s and only Elena (1898-1979) reached an old age.

Some members of the Genko family originating from Nestor Karlovich Genko managed to survive. Numerous descendants of his eldest son live in France. His daughter and the family of the youngest son live in St. Petersburg, Russia. Several descendants of his oldest daughter live in Moscow and Vitebsk.

== Awards and decorations ==
- The merits of Genko were rewarded by numerous awards and decorations.
- Order of Saint Stanislaus 1st degree
- Order of St. Vladimir 3rd degree
- Order of St. Anna 2nd degree with swords (for bravery during the Russo-Turkish War (1877–78) and crossing of the Balkans)
- Commemorative medal of the Russo-Turkish War (1877–78)
- Medal for the organisation of civil government in Bulgaria
- Medal for the commemoration of the reign of Tsar Alexander III
- Medal for the 100 years of Imperial Estates

== In memoriam ==
In connection with the death of Genko, the Russian Society of Forestry, headed by Professor L. I. Yachnov, held a memorial session at which eminent scientists came forward with the memories of their deceased colleague. The famous forester G. F. Morozov said:

Nestor Karlovich was called to forestry, not by accidental circumstances. He sharply distinguished himself from other specialists not only through his outstanding knowledge, unusual energy, and wide experience, but also love of forestry which was not a sentimental feeling. He committed himself to forestry. Nestor Karlovich had strong opinions in the field of forestry, and what is unfortunately seldom seen; he was a Forester-Citizen.

After long period of neglect, the forest community again remembered Genko, in 1998, by a decree of the governor of the Samara Region, the forest area of Doubovo-Oumet was named in his honour and a memorial plate established.

On the occasion of the 165th anniversary of his birth and 100th anniversary of his death, 2004 was declared the "Year of Genko" in the Samara region, marked by an inter-regional scientific conference, an edition of scientific material, the establishment of memorial squares and excursions to the Genko Forests.
