= Lodygin =

Lodygin (Russian: Лодыгин) is a Russian masculine surname, its feminine counterpart is Lodygina. It may refer to

- Alexander Lodygin (1847–1923), Russian electrical engineer and inventor
  - Lodygin (crater) on the Moon named after Alexander Lodygin
- Yuri Lodygin (born 1990), Russian-Greek football goalkeeper
