= Genko Forest Belt =

The Forest belt of Genko
- Lesopolosa Genko
- IUCN category III (natural monument or feature)
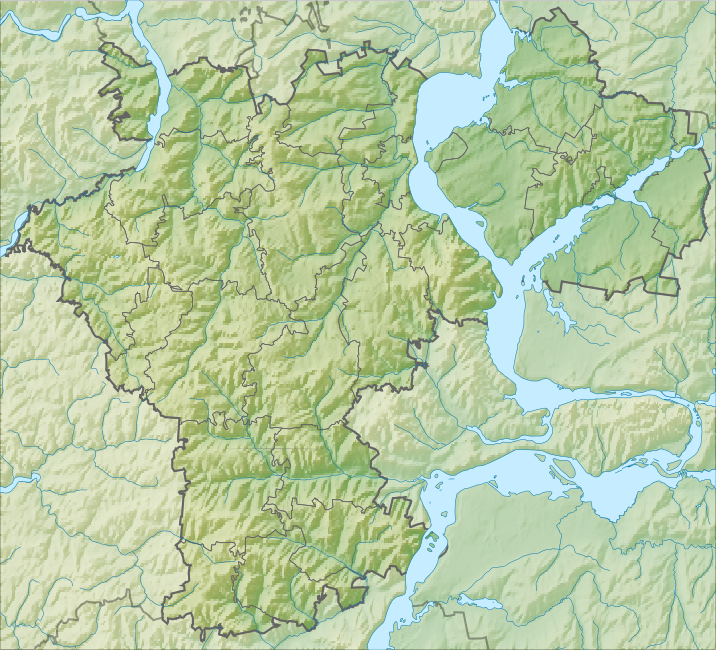
- Location within Ulyanovsk Oblast
- Location: Melekess District, Ulyanovsk, Russia
- Coordinates: 53°56′40″N 49°52′40″E
- Area: 16.25 km^{2} (6.27 sq mi)
- Established: 1989

Genko's Forest Belt (Russian: Лесополоса Генко) is a system of historic forest belts in Russia's Ulyanovsk Oblast. Planted over a century ago, it is now considered a "natural monument", and is legally protected as one of the protected areas of Ulyanovsk Oblast.

== History ==
In 1886-1903, watershed protection forest belt planting was carried out in this area. The project was initiated by the well-known Russian forester, Nestor Karlovich Genko (1839-1904). The windbreak forest strips planted under his plan are still considered both to be beneficial for the local agriculture and to be of interest for researchers.

== Current state ==
The plantings are in a good condition, and naturally regenerate. In some areas, they are already composed of the second generation of trees. The most common tree species occurring in the forest strips are: oak, maple, pine, birch, linden, elm.

The forest strips' total area is 16.25 km^{2} (1,625 ha).

Construction work, agricultural activity, felling of trees (except for removal of dead trees, etc. for the forest maintenance purposes) are prohibited in the forest strip.
