= Reflectron =

Time-of-flight mass spectrometer with an ion mirror

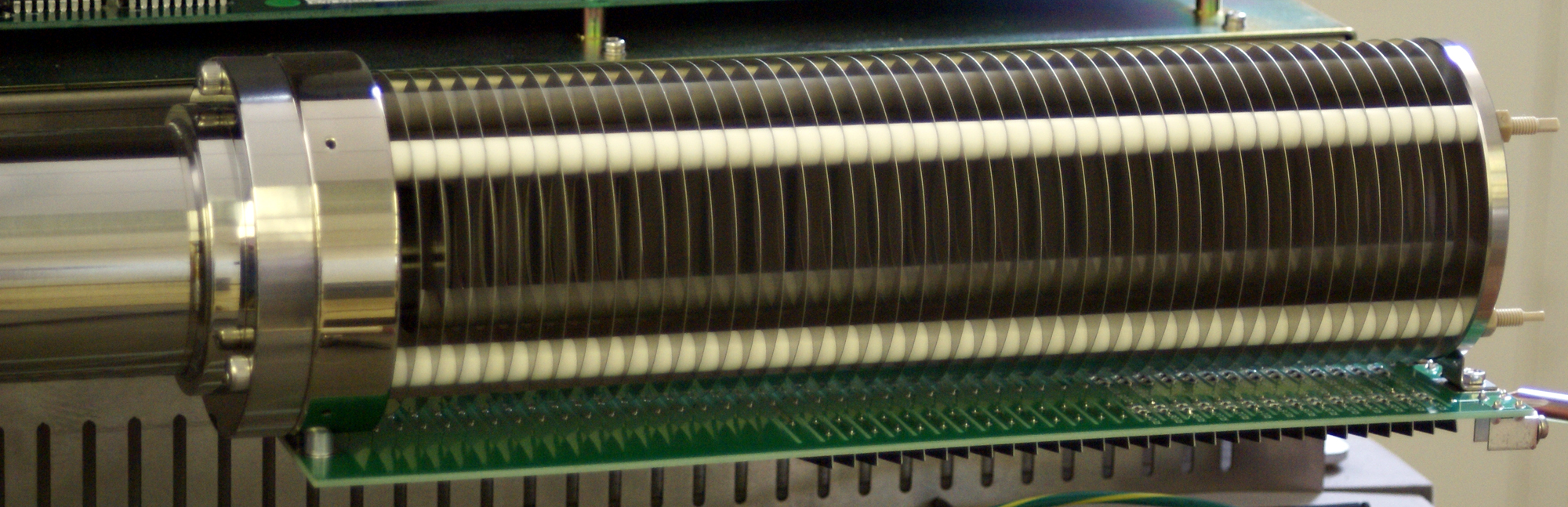
An ion mirror (right) attached to a flight tube (left) of the reflectron. Voltages applied to a stack of metal plates create the electric field reflecting the ions back to the flight tube.

A reflectron (mass reflectron) is a type of time-of-flight mass spectrometer (TOF MS) that comprises a pulsed ion source, field-free region, ion mirror, and ion detector and uses a static or time dependent electric field in the ion mirror to reverse the direction of travel of the ions entering it. Using the reflectron, one can substantially diminish a spread of flight times of the ions with the same mass-to-charge ratio (m/z) caused by spread in kinetic energy of these ions measured at the exit from the ion source.

== Development ==
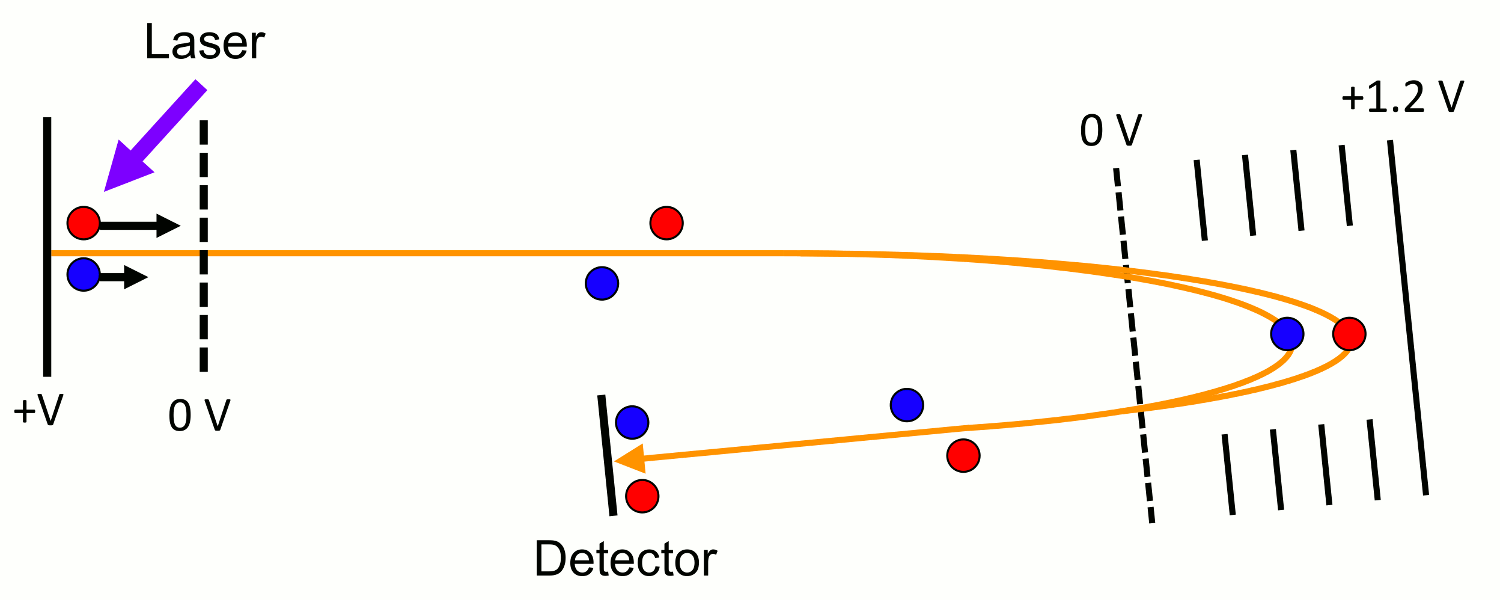
In the reflection, the higher energy ion (red) takes a longer path but arrives at the detector at the same time as the lower energy ion (blue) of the same mass.

The idea of improving mass resolution in TOF MS by implementing the reflection of ions from a region with retarding electric field (the ion mirror) has been first proposed by Russian scientist S. G. Alikhanov. In 1973, the dual-stage reflectron utilizing an ion mirror with two regions of homogeneous field was built in a laboratory of Boris Aleksandrovich Mamyrin. Mass resolution of the reflectron measured over broad mass range is much larger than that in a simpler (so-called linear) time-of-flight mass spectrometer comprising a pulsed ion source, flight tube, and ion detector. The masses of ions analyzed in the reflectron can span from a few daltons to a few million daltons. Sensitivity in the reflectron used for the analysis of ions produced in vacuum by photo or electron ionization, e.g., matrix-assisted laser desorption/ionization source, can be lower than in linear TOF MS due to post-source decay - a dissociation of vibrationally-excited molecular ions (often referred as metastable ions).

== Single-stage reflectron ==
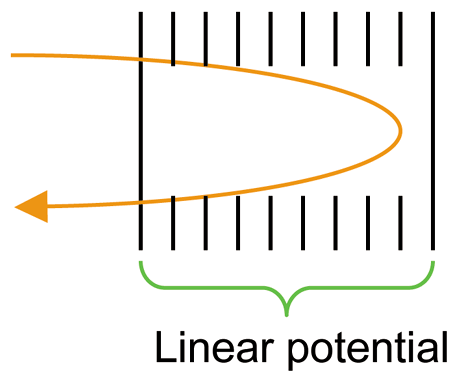
Schematic drawing of a single-stage reflectron.

A single-stage reflectron is equipped with an ion mirror that has a single electric field region. The distribution of electric potential along the central axis of the ion mirror can be linear or non-linear. Also, the electric field in the mirror can be constant or time-dependent. In single-stage reflectrons with homogeneous field, a zero field in a field-free region of a flight tube and the homogeneous field inside the ion mirror are separated by highly transparent (~95%) metal grid. The grid position is then referred as the entrance (exit) to the ion mirror and is used to calculate the retarding electric field. The single-stage reflector utilizing homogeneous field can be used to attain high mass resolution in cases where the variation of energies of ions leaving the ion source is small (typically less than a few per cent). Time of flight t of the ions with mass m, charge q, kinetic energy U is

$$t(U) = \frac{L\sqrt{m}}{\sqrt{2U}}\ + \frac{2 L_{m}\sqrt{2mU}}{U_{m}q}\$$

where L is the path length of the ions in a field-free space, L_{m} is the length of ion mirror, U_{m} is the voltage applied across the mirror. To find a first-order compensation condition for flight time t with respect to spread dU in ion energy U, the following condition should be fulfilled

$$\frac{dt}{dU} = 0$$

Assume that the kinetic energy of the ions in the field-free region equals the ion potential energy near the stop point of the ions inside the mirror (we assume that this stop point is very close to the back electrode of the mirror, i.e. U_{m} = U). From here it follows that

$$L_{m} = \frac{L}{4}$$

In practice, the mirror length should be 10-20% longer to accommodate all ions whose kinetic energy is spread over some interval.

So, the electric field E_{m} in the mirror of a single-stage reflector should be

$$E_{m} = \frac{4U}{L}$$

In case of a wider variation of dU, the relative width of the time-of-flight peaks dt/t in such a reflectron is determined by the uncompensated part of the flight time t(U) proportional to the second derivative

$$\frac{dt}{t}  = k \frac{d^2t}{dU^2}$$.

where k is a constant depending on the parameters of the single-stage reflector.

== Dual-stage reflectron ==
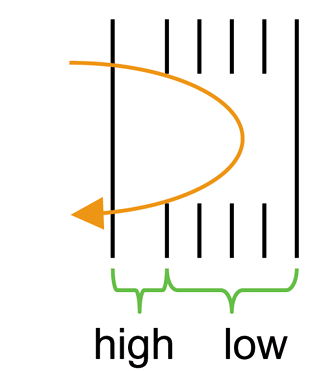
Schematic drawing of an ion mirror with high- and low-field regions (dual-stage reflectron).

The mirror in a dual-stage reflectron has two regions (stages) with different fields. This makes it possible to zero both the first and second derivatives of t(U) with respect to energy U. That is why dual-stage reflectrons can compensate flight times over larger variations in ion kinetic energy compared to single-stage ones. This type of reflectrons is typically employed in orthogonal acceleration (oa) TOF MS. "Classical" (i.e., Mamyrin's) design includes two highly transparent conductive grids separating regions with homogeneous fields. In general, the first stage (section) of the reflectron has high electric field, in this section the ions decelerate losing 2/3 or more of their kinetic energy depending on the reflectron parameters; the second stage has lower field, in this stage the ions are repelled toward the first region. Mass resolution in dual-stage reflectron is mainly determined by ion scattering on the grids, the spread of kinetic energy of ions leaving the pulsed ion source, and accuracy of mechanical alignment. To diminish effect of scattering, the length of the first deceleration region should be relatively large. Ion scattering makes using triple- and further stage reflectrons impractical.

The effect of ion scattering on mass resolution in single- and dual-stage reflectrons can be diminished by utilizing polarized grid geometry.

== Gridless reflectron ==
The gridless design of the reflectron usually comprises two stages with individually adjustable voltages: a decelerating region, where the ions lose about two-thirds of their kinetic energy, and repelling region, where the ions reverse their direction of motion. The symmetry of gridless reflectron is typically a cylindrical one, though a 2D design comprising two parallel flat electrode systems can be utilized for the same purpose of flight-time compensation of energy spread the ions acquire at the exit from the ion source. The gridless reflectron almost always includes a thick electrostatic Einzel lens placed at its front or some distance. The curved potential distribution in a gridless reflectron geometrically affects the trajectories of reflected ions and therefore the gridless reflectron either focus or defocus the ions, which depends on a chosen field profile. In addition, one needs to take into account that the lensing also affects the time-of-flight of ions traversing different sections of the reflectron. Due to the positive voltages in the reflectron with respect to that applied to the field-free drift region (this region is often kept at the ground potential), the reflectron entrance acts like the first half of a "positive" electrostatic lens (Einzel lens where the central electrode is kept at a positive potential with respect to two outer electrodes) causing the ion beam to diverge when entering the reflectron. A positive (decelerating) lens affects the ion flight times as well as the spread of ion flight times (on-axis vs. off-axis ions) more strongly than a negative (accelerating) lens does under similar focusing conditions because in positive Einzel lens the ions are moving along the extended (i.e., more lengthy) off-axis trajectories at lower ion energies. To minimize the positive lens effect produced by the gridless reflectron, one must add a negative Einzel lens near the reflectron exit, which conducts the geometric focusing, i.e., directs the converging ion beam toward the ion detector and compensate for the flight time spread. The reflectron with the negative Einzel lens placed near its exit is sometimes referred as the Frey mirror. As earlier as 1985, Frey et al. reported on the gridless reflector that demonstrated mass resolution over 10,000 while mass analyzing the laser-ablated plumes that exhibited 3.3% kinetic energy spread at the exit of the ion source. In the 1980s, there were suggested several approaches to a design of gridless reflectrons, mainly aimed at finding the middle ground between higher transmission (i.e., directing a significant per cent of exiting ions toward the ion detector) and target mass resolution.

One implementation of gridless reflectron utilizes a curved field where the electric potential V(x) along the mirror axis depends non-linearly on distance x to the mirror entrance. Time of flight compensation for ions with different kinetic energy can be obtained by adjusting voltage on the elements producing the electric field inside the mirror, which values follow the equation of an arc of a circle: R^{2} = V(x)^{2} + kx^{2}, where k and R are some constants.

The electric potential in some other implementation of gridless reflectron (a so-called quadratic-field reflectron) is proportional to a square of a distance x to the mirror entrance: V(x)=kx^{2} thus exhibiting a case of one-dimensional harmonic field. If both the ion source and the detector are placed at the reflectron entrance and if the ions travel in a close proximity of the ion mirror axis, the flight times of ions in the quadratic-field reflectron are almost independent on ion kinetic energy.

A gridless reflectron with nonlinear field, which comprised only three cylindrical elements was also demonstrated. Bergmann et al. implemented an original numerical approach to finding voltage distribution across the stack of the metal electrodes to create a nonlinear field in different regions of the reflectron to provide conditions for both geometrical focusing and compensation of flight times caused by the spread of kinetic energies of ions entering the reflectron at different angles.

== Post-source decay ==
A post-source decay (PSD) is a process specific to the ion source utilizing matrix-assisted laser desorption/ionization and operating in vacuum. In the post-source decay, parent ions (typically of several keV kinetic energy) fragment in a process of laser-induced fragmentation or high-energy collision-induced dissociation (HE CID). Time interval suitable for observation of the post-source decay in the reflectron starts after the precursors (parent ions) leave the ion source and ends prior to the moment when the precursors enter the ion mirror. The kinetic energy of fragment ions of mass m in the post-source decay significantly differs from that of parent ions of mass M and is proportional to m/M. So, the distribution of kinetic energies for the PSD ions is extremely large. Not surprisingly, it cannot be compensated in "classic" single or double-stage reflectrons. To achieve acceptable mass resolution for PSD ions with masses typically distributed over broad mass range, these ions are accelerated to energies substantially (at least, a factor of 4) exceeding the initial energy of precursor ions. Use of gridless curved-field mirror or that with time-dependent field also improves the mass resolution for fragment ions generated in the post-source decay.
