= Yefim Smolin =

Russian glassmaker

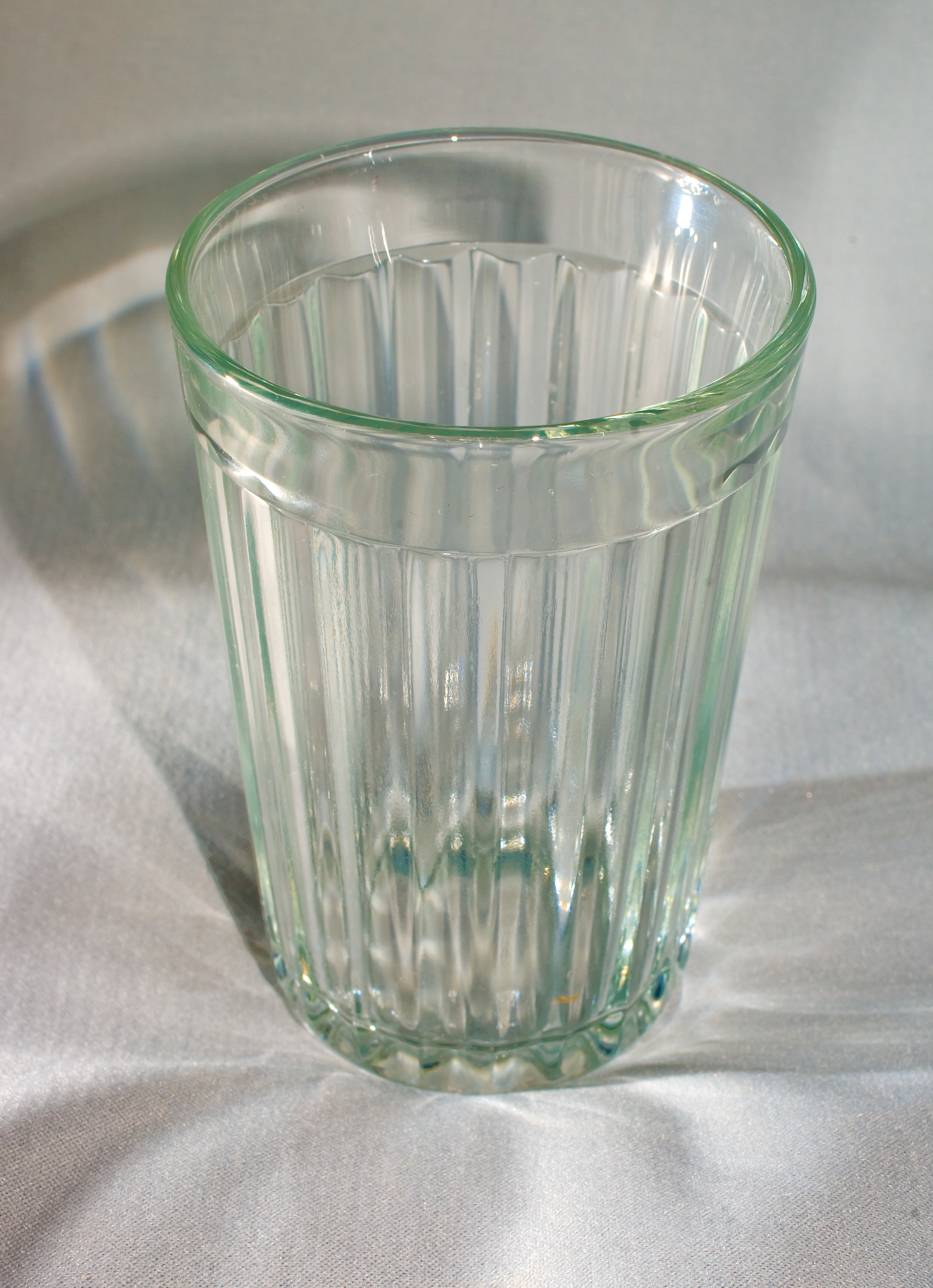
A classic 20-facets Russian and Soviet table-glass

Yefim Smolin (Russian: Ефим Смолин) was a Russian glass-maker and inventor of granyonyi stakan (faceted glass or table-glass), living in the late 17th century and early 18th century in the area of the modern Vladimir Oblast in Russia.

Granyonyi stakan has certain advantages over the other drinkware, since due to its form and hardness it is more difficult to break.

A legend says that the first known faceted glass was given as a present to Tsar Peter the Great from a glass-maker called Yefim Smolin, living in Vladimir Oblast. He boasted to Tsar that his glass couldn't be broken. Tsar Peter liked the present, however, after drinking some alcoholic beverage from it, he said loudly Let the glass be! (Russian: Стакану быть! - literally the glass be), threw the glass on the ground and managed to break it. But Peter didn't punish the glass-maker, and the production of such glasses continued. According to the legend, people present during this episode misinterpreted the Tsar's words and thought that Peter called to break the glasses (Russian: Стаканы бить! - literally beat glasses or break glasses), that's how a tradition of breaking drinkware on certain occasions appeared in Russia. Glasses were broken after especially important toasts or just during the especially cheerful parties. Russian restaurants even held a special prices for breaking the glasses. Breaking of drinkware, or, in wider context, any tableware, is believed in Russia to bring luck and happiness.
