= Pilot (icebreaker) =

Pilot (Russian: Пайлот, romanized: Paylot) was a Russian passenger boat, described by some as the world's first icebreaker.

== Icebreaking operation ==
Pilot had originally been built as a steam-powered propeller passenger boat. It had the bow altered to achieve an ice-clearing capability (20° raise from keel line). Conversion had been done in 1864 under an order of its owner, the local merchant Mikhail Britnev. This allowed Pilot to push itself on the top of the ice and consequently break it. Allegedly, Britnev fashioned the bow of his ship after the shape of old wooden Pomor boats (kochs), which had been navigating icy waters of the White Sea and Barents Sea for centuries.

Pilot was used between 1864-1890 for navigation in the Gulf of Finland between Kronstadt and Oranienbaum thus extending the summer navigation season by several weeks. Inspired by the success of Pilot, Mikhail Britnev built a second similar vessel "Boy" ("Battle" in Russian) in 1875 and a third "Booy" ("Buoy" in Russian) in 1889.

The cold winter of 1870–1871 led to the international recognition of Britnev's design. That year the Elbe River and the port of Hamburg froze, which caused a prolonged halt of navigation and huge commercial losses. In such circumstances, Germans purchased Pilot's design from Britnev for some 300 rubles. Thus the German Eisbrecher I appeared in 1871, and other European countries soon followed the suit.

With its rounded shape and strong metal hull, Pilot had all the main features present in the modern icebreakers, therefore it is often considered the first true icebreaker. Another contender for this title is icebreaker Yermak, built in England for Russia according to the design of Admiral Stepan Makarov and under his supervision. Makarov borrowed the main principles from Pilot and applied them for creation of the first polar icebreaker, which was able to run over and crush pack ice.

== Modern research ==
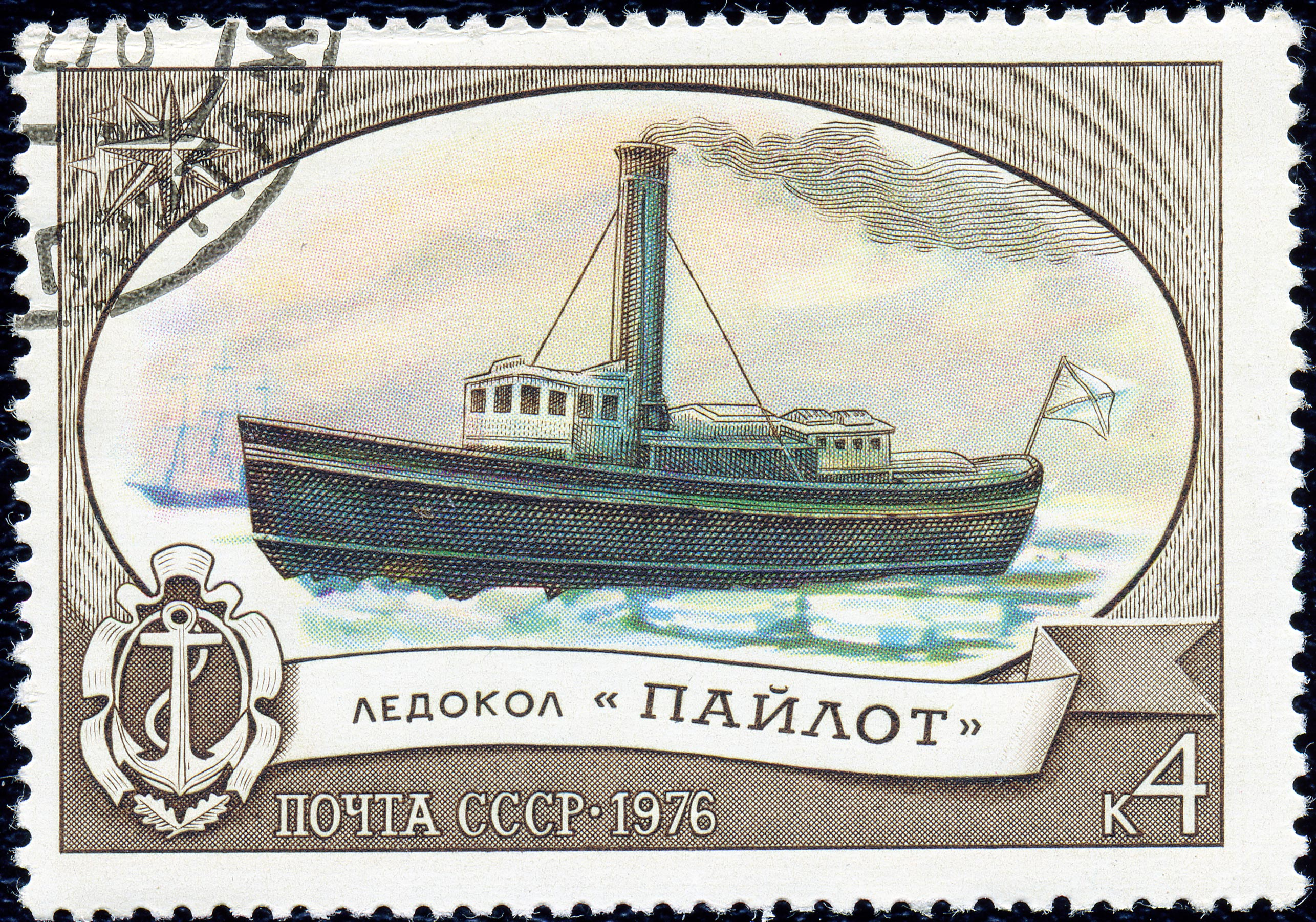
A stamp that purported to show the vessel

Up until recent times the information about Pilot was scarce, there was no contemporary photos or descriptions. It was not even known when and where it was manufactured, beyond the English-language name. In 2020 Д. В. Понкратов, Х. П. Мартинес published the results of their detailed research which shed a considerable light. In the archives in Newcastle upon Tyne they have found the drawings of a boat named Pilot and cross-referenced its ownership to Britnev, concluding that it must be the Pilot in question (a number of vessels did have the name). They also argued that the boat can hardly be named the first "true" icebreaker, because from much earlier times special vessels were used to break thin ice to extend the period of navigation. It is even unclear how exactly Britnev modified the design beyond the statements that he cut the stern at 20 degrees, a design he borrowed from Arctic-faring vessels of pomors, and reinforced it with steel sheets. Finally, it turns out the vessel on the Soviet stamp does not look like the true Pilot, which was manufactured at wharf no. 103 of the Low Walker Yard, Newcastle (owned by C. Mitchell & Co) and launched on May 14, 1862.

== Literature ==
- Морской энциклопедический словарь [Marine Encyclopedic Dictionary] (in Russian). СПб: Судостроение. 1991. ISBN 5-7355-0280-8.
- Henrik Ramsay (1947). I kamp med Östersjöns isar. Holger Schildts förlag.
