= E. K. Gauzen =

Russian inventor

E. K. Gauzen was a Russian naval technician. Working in the Russian naval base at Kronshtadt near Saint Petersburg, in 1829 he invented a "diving machine". This was a type of diving costume that consisted of air-supplied metallic helmet and leather suit. Gauzen's invention was used by the Russian Navy for underwater work until 1880.
