= Boris Mamyrin =

Russian physicist

- Born: Boris Aleksandrovich Mamyrin; May 25, 1919; Lipetsk, Tambov Governorate, RSFSR
- Died: March 5, 2007 (aged 87); Saint Petersburg, Russia
- Citizenship: Russian
- Education: Leningrad Polytechnic Institute
- Known for: Inventor of the Reflectron
- Awards: Konstantinov Award (1982); Distinguished Contribution in Mass Spectrometry (2000); Russian Society for Mass Spectrometry Gold Medal (2005)
- Scientific career
- Fields: Mass spectrometry
- Workplaces: Ioffe Physical-Technical Institute

Boris Aleksandrovich Mamyrin (Russian: Борис Александрович Мамырин; 25 May 1919 – 5 March 2007) was a Soviet and Russian physicist, best known for his invention of the electrostatic ion mirror mass spectrometer known as the reflectron.

== Biography ==
Mamyrin was born in 1919 in Lipetsk, Soviet Russia during Russian Civil War. Both of his parents were medical doctors and his early aim was to follow in their footsteps. However, shortly after he obtained his M.S. degree in physics from the Leningrad Polytechnic Institute, World War II cut his studies short. He served in the army throughout the war, finally being discharged from military service in 1948. He returned to the Polytechnic Institute and obtained his doctoral degree within a year. He became the head and leading research scientist of the laboratory for mass spectrometry at Ioffe Physico-Technical Institute of the Russian Academy of Sciences. He was a corresponding member of the Russian Academy of Sciences and a full member of the Russian Academy of Natural Sciences.

== See also ==
- Time-of-flight mass spectrometry
