= Vezdekhod =

Russian prototype tank

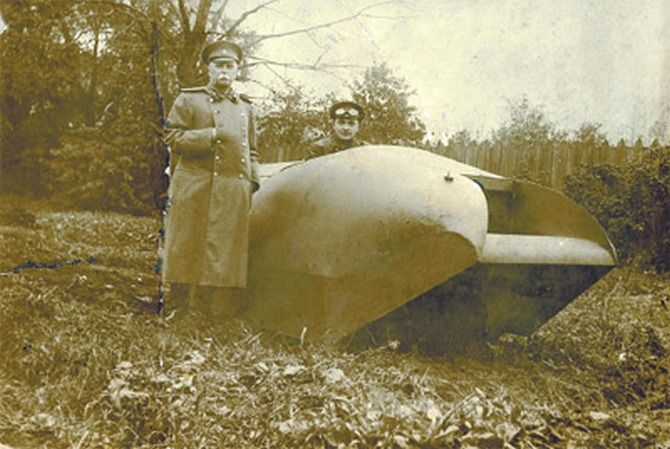
- Type: Prototype tank
- Place of origin: Russian Empire

Production history
- Designer: Aleksandr Porokhovschikov

Specifications
- Length: 3.6 m
- Width: 2 m
- Height: 1.5 m
- Engine: 2-cyl petrol 10 hp (7.5 kW)
- Maximum speed: 42.6 km/h (26.5 mph)

The Vezdekhod (Russian: Вездеход) was the first true tank to be developed in the Russian Empire. The word Vezdekhod means "anywhere goer" and in modern Russian means "all-terrain vehicle". The initial project was indeed an ATV. It did not however progress further than a pre-production model, due to problems in the design. The second design, which can be described as tank was submitted to the military only after the news broke about Western tanks and the government started negotiating purchases of them in 1917.

== History ==
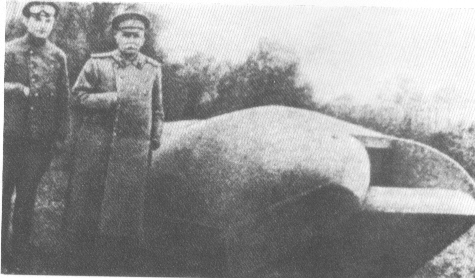
The Vezdekhod tank in 1915

In August 1914, a 23-year-old Russian aircraft designer Aleksandr Porokhovschikov (Rus: Александр Пороховщиков), based in Riga (now in Latvia), offered to build a vehicle with cross-country capability. The working drawings and estimate were finished by January 1915, and on January 13 approval was given to proceed with construction.

The Vezdekhod had a welded frame which ran on a wide single track made from rubberized fabric stretched over four drums, with a fifth drum tensioning the track from above. Two small wheels were placed on the sides of the track, and could be lowered to steer it, being controlled by a steering wheel. The machine was propelled by a 10 hp (7.5 kW) petrol engine driving through the rear drum. Porokhovščikov intended that the Vezdekhod should run on the back drum and its wheels while on firm ground, while on soft ground it would lie down on its track. Preliminary automotive testing began on 18 March.

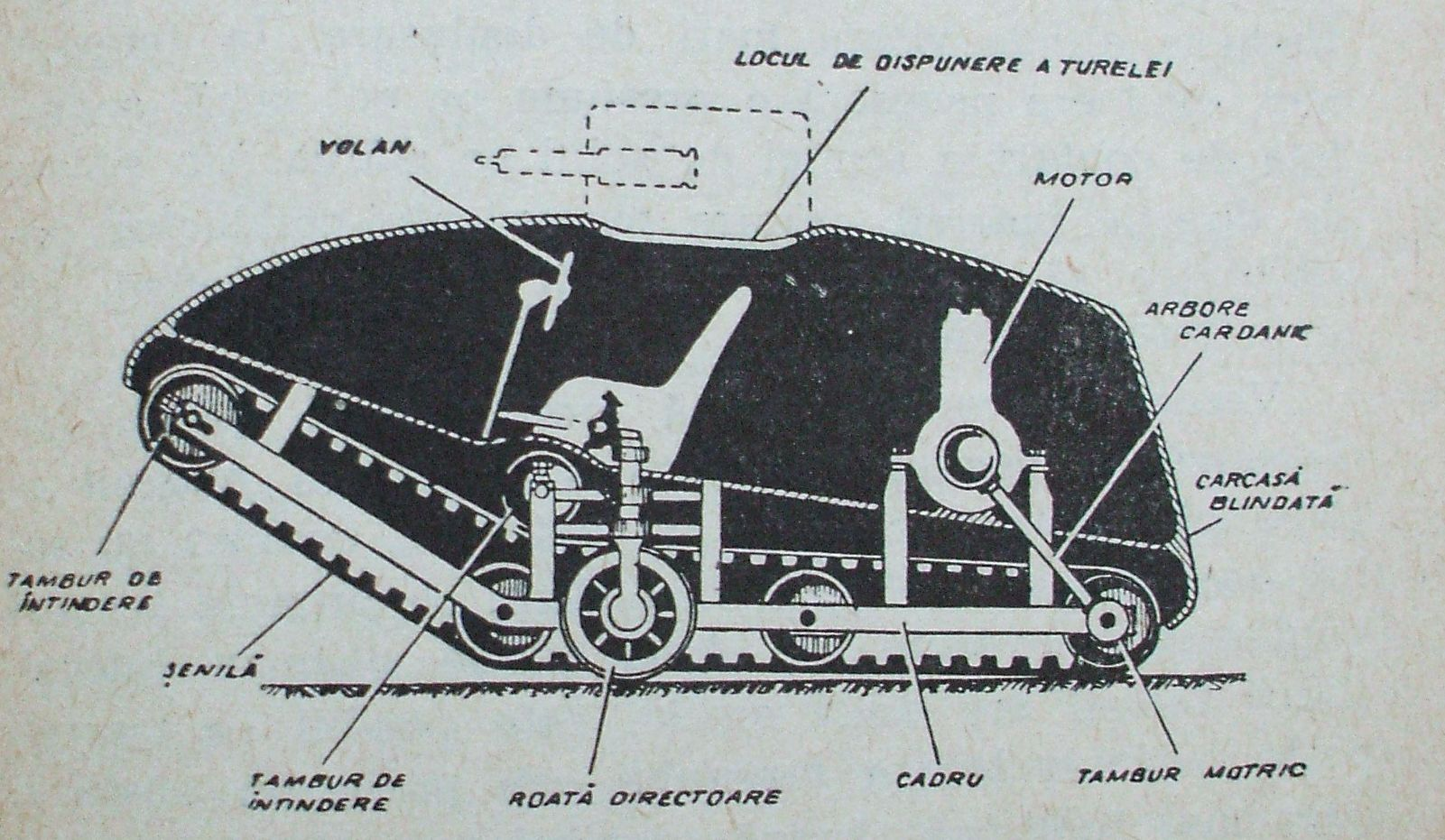
Technical drawing of a Vezdekhod tank.

Construction of the prototype began in February 1915 with the first tests on a paved road being carried out in May, with further tests proceeding until the end of the year. In cross-country trials the Vezdekhod was reported to be capable of a speed of 40 Verst per hour (42.6 km/h (26.5 mph)) with simulated armor weight but proved impossible to steer using the wheels provided for that purpose and the project was therefore rejected.

The actual performance of Vezdekhod is debated, but according to the test commission Report No. 4563: "It appears that Vezdekhod is a sound and practical idea; it can achieve a speed of 25 Verst/hour (26.67 km/h (16.57 mph)). In addition, Vezdekhod can ascend a slope of 40 degrees inclination, cross a trench three metres wide, and a vertical obstacle of 3/4 metre. All significant holes and rough surfaces were crossed wherever tests were carried out. Vezdekhod steers easily during fast motion, and turns very satisfactorily. In all, Vezdekhod crosses terrain and obstacles impassable to conventional motor vehicles."

The project was reopened in October 1916 but no further progress was made.

The original blueprints, and possible photographs have been lost, perhaps due to the Revolution of 1917. After Russian newspapers published news about the first British Tanks in World War I, Porokhovschikov argued that the Vezdekhod was the rightful first tank. After the Russian Revolution, Soviet propaganda promoted the idea that Vezdekhod was the first tank.

== See also ==
- Tsar Tank
