= Mikhail Britnev =

Russian shipowner (1822–1889)

- Russian: Михаил Осипович Бритнев
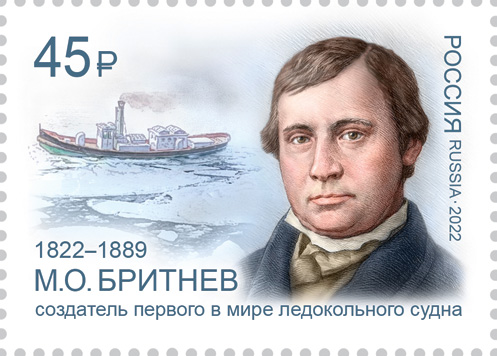
- Britnev and Icebreaker Pilot on a Russian postage stamp
- Born: Mikhail Osipovich Britnev; 1822; Kronstadt, Russian Empire
- Died: 1889 (aged 66-67); Kronstadt, Russian Empire
- Occupations: Shipowner, shipbuilder
- Known for: Creation of the first metal-hull icebreaker (1864)

Mikhail Osipovich Britnev (Russian: Михаил Осипович Бритнев; 1822–1889) was a Russian shipowner and shipbuilder, who created the first metal-hull icebreaker named Pilot in 1864.

Britnev was bourn to a prominent family of merchants that settled in Kronstadt in 1736. His relative Galaktion Britnev served as the city mayor from 1808 to 1815 and established a private theater in Kronstadt. His other relatives, Alexander and Gavriil, were members of the Kronstadt City Duma. Mikhail completed his education in Saint Petersburg, and then briefly worked in business in Kronstadt and Oranienbaum. In the 1840s he moved to England to study shipbuilding, and after returning to Kronstadt founded his own shipbuilding workshops there. They were built by 1858, and by 1868 turned into a shipbuilding, foundry and mechanical plant.

One of the first government orders executed by the Britnev's plant was the Miner steamship, which was built in 1867. The plant then mostly worked for the Russian Naval Ministry, building minesweepers and overhauling steamships. From 1870 to 1879 the plant built 12 large iron barges, one of which served as far as in Vladivostok, a steam barge, and five mine ships. During its first twenty years, the plant had completed approximately 60 steamships and barges.

The number of government orders had greatly reduced in the 1880s. During those years, Britnev built two passenger steamships, Boi and Bui. Bui was the most powerful and the last, 69th, ship of Britnev.
