= Semyon Kataev =

Soviet scientist and inventor

Semyon Isidorovich Kataev
- Born: 9 February 1904; Village of Eliance (now Starodubsky District, Bryansk region)
- Died: 10 July 1991 (aged 87); Moscow, Russia
- Scientific career
- Fields: Radio and television electronics

Semyon Isidorovich Kataev (1904-1991) was a Soviet scientist and inventor in the field of television and radio electronics. He earned a doctorate of Technical Sciences (1951), became a Professor (1952) and was awarded Honored Worker of Science and Technology (1968).

== Early life ==
His mother was Pelageya Alekseevna, a Don Cossack. His father was Isidor p., Eleonskii and was a petty bourgeois. Five years after his birth the family moved to Sulin (Donbass). At age 10 Sam lost his mother.

In 1921-1922 he joined the All-Union Leninist Young Communist League. He was resistant to studying at the Rabfak, and then at Moscow Higher Technical School at the faculty of electrical engineering.

Student Bauman Kataev invented an amplifier at all frequencies. He organized and led the circle in which he studied under Vladimir A. Kotelnikov.

In 1929 he received a diploma as an electrical engineer for radio. He began working in VEI, where he studied under radiophysicist B. A. Vvedensky. That year Kataev submitted a patent application for "Device for the electrical telescope in natural colors" (reproduced sequentially with the cathode ray tube and emerging on the screen in a natural multicolor picture).

On September 24, 1931, Vladimir K. Zworykin used an iconoscope made by Kataev, applied for a patent and received the Copyright certificate of the USSR No. 29.865.

In 1931 he transmitted the first television image.

In 1932, he led the development of a vacuum tube with magnetic focusing of the electron beam.

In 1933 he refined his iconoscope. He received patents for the transfer of "electronic image" with conductive photocathode on dielectric (dated September 30, 1933 with priority from February 20, 1932).

In 1936 he traveled in the U.S. where he exchange experiences with Zvorykina. Kataev gave him the book Cathode-ray TV tubes (M., Svyazist, 1936).

In 1940, he edited Fundamentals of Television.

In 1944, with a group of specialists, he offered the world's first standard television broadcasting on 625 lines.

In 1949 he proposed using the moon as a passive repeater.

In 1957 proposed the use of satellites for TV transmission.

Until 1987 he worked at the Department of Television at the Moscow electrotechnical Institute of communications,

== Sources ==
- S. V. Istomin, Истомин С. В. Самые знаменитые изобретатели России. — Moscow: Вече, 2000 — 469 pp. ("The most famous inventors of Russia")
