= Multiple discovery =

Hypothesis about scientific discoveries and inventions

The concept of multiple discovery (also known as simultaneous invention) is the hypothesis that most scientific discoveries and inventions are made independently and more or less simultaneously by multiple scientists and inventors. The concept of multiple discovery opposes a traditional view—the "heroic theory" of invention and discovery. Multiple discovery is analogous to convergent evolution in biological evolution.

== Multiples ==
When Nobel laureates are announced annually—especially in physics, chemistry, physiology, medicine, and economics—increasingly, in the given field, rather than just a single laureate, there are two, or the maximally permissible three, who often have independently made the same discovery. Historians and sociologists have remarked the occurrence, in science, of "multiple independent discovery". Robert K. Merton defined such "multiples" as instances in which similar discoveries are made by scientists working independently of each other. Merton contrasted a "multiple" with a "singleton"—a discovery that has been made uniquely by a single scientist or group of scientists working together. As Merton said, "Sometimes the discoveries are simultaneous or almost so; sometimes a scientist will make a new discovery which, unknown to him, somebody else has made years before."

Commonly cited examples of multiple independent discovery are the 17th-century independent formulation of calculus by Isaac Newton, Gottfried Wilhelm Leibniz and others; the 18th-century discovery of oxygen by Carl Wilhelm Scheele, Joseph Priestley, Antoine Lavoisier and others; and the theory of evolution of species, independently advanced in the 19th century by Charles Darwin and Alfred Russel Wallace. What holds for discoveries, also goes for inventions. Examples are the blast furnace (invented independently in China, Europe and Africa), the crossbow (invented independently in China, Greece, Africa, northern Canada, and the Baltic countries), magnetism (discovered independently in Greece, China, and India), the computer mouse (both rolling and optical), powered flight, and the telephone.

Multiple independent discovery, however, is not limited to only a few historic instances involving giants of scientific research. Merton believed that it is multiple discoveries, rather than unique ones, that represent the common pattern in science.

== Mechanism ==
Multiple discoveries in the history of science provide evidence for evolutionary models of science and technology, such as memetics (the study of self-replicating units of culture), evolutionary epistemology (which applies the concepts of biological evolution to study of the growth of human knowledge), and cultural selection theory (which studies sociological and cultural evolution in a Darwinian manner).

Multiple independent discovery and invention, like discovery and invention generally, have been fostered by the evolution of means of communication: roads, vehicles, sailing vessels, writing, printing, institutions of education, reliable postal services, telegraphy, and mass media, including the internet. Gutenberg's invention of printing (which itself involved a number of discrete inventions) substantially facilitated the transition from the Middle Ages to modern times. All these communication developments have catalyzed and accelerated the process of recombinant conceptualization, and thus also of multiple independent discovery.

Multiple independent discoveries show an increased incidence beginning in the 17th century. This may accord with the thesis of British philosopher A.C. Grayling that the 17th century was crucial in the creation of the modern world view, freed from the shackles of religion, the occult, and uncritical faith in the authority of Aristotle. Grayling speculates that Europe's Thirty Years' War (1618–1648), with the concomitant breakdown of authority, made freedom of thought and open debate possible, so that "modern science... rests on the heads of millions of dead." He also notes "the importance of the development of a reliable postal service... in enabling savants... to be in scholarly communication.... [T]he cooperative approach, first recommended by Francis Bacon, was essential to making science open to peer review and public verification, and not just a matter of the lone [individual] issuing... idiosyncratic pronouncements."

== Humanities ==
The paradigm of recombinant conceptualization (see above)—more broadly, of recombinant occurrences—that explains multiple discovery in science and the arts, also elucidates the phenomenon of historic recurrence, wherein similar events are noted in the histories of countries widely separated in time and geography. It is the recurrence of patterns that lends a degree of prognostic power—and, thus, additional scientific validity—to the findings of history.

== The arts ==
Lamb and Easton have argued that science and art are similar with regard to multiple discovery. When two scientists independently make the same discovery, their papers are not word-for-word identical, but the core ideas in the papers are the same; likewise, two novelists may independently write novels with the same core themes, though their novels are not identical word-for-word.

== Civility ==
After Isaac Newton and Gottfried Wilhelm Leibniz had exchanged information on their respective systems of calculus in the 1670s, Newton in the first edition of his Principia (1687), in a scholium, apparently accepted Leibniz's independent discovery of calculus. In 1699, however, a Swiss mathematician suggested to Britain's Royal Society that Leibniz had borrowed his calculus from Newton. In 1705 Leibniz, in an anonymous review of Newton's Opticks, implied that Newton's fluxions (Newton's term for differential calculus) were an adaptation of Leibniz's calculus. In 1712 the Royal Society appointed a committee to examine the documents in question; the same year, the Society published a report, written by Newton himself, asserting his priority. Soon after Leibniz died in 1716, Newton denied that his own 1687 Principia scholium "allowed [Leibniz] the invention of the calculus differentialis independently of my own"; and the third edition of Newton's Principia (1726) omitted the tell-tale scholium. It is now accepted that Newton and Leibniz discovered calculus independently of each other.

In another classic case of multiple discovery, the two discoverers showed more civility. By June 1858 Charles Darwin had completed over two-thirds of his On the Origin of Species when he received a startling letter from a naturalist, Alfred Russel Wallace, 13 years his junior, with whom he had corresponded. The letter summarized Wallace's theory of natural selection, with conclusions identical to Darwin's own. Darwin turned for advice to his friend Charles Lyell, the foremost geologist of the day. Lyell proposed that Darwin and Wallace prepare a joint communication to the scientific community. Darwin being preoccupied with his mortally ill youngest son, Lyell enlisted Darwin's closest friend, Joseph Hooker, director of Kew Gardens, and together on 1 July 1858 they presented to the Linnean Society a joint paper that brought together Wallace's abstract with extracts from Darwin's earlier, 1844 essay on the subject. The paper was also published that year in the Society's journal. Neither the public reading of the joint paper nor its publication attracted interest; but Wallace, "admirably free from envy or jealousy," had been content to remain in Darwin's shadow.

== See also ==
- Axial Age
- Coincidence
- Convergent evolution
- Discovery (observation)
- Great minds think alike
- Historical recurrence
- History of science
- Hundredth monkey effect
- Invention
- List of multiple discoveries
- Matilda effect
- Matthew effect
- Opposing theories of discovery and invention:
  - Great man theory
  - Heroic theory of invention and scientific development
- Reinventing the wheel
- Scientific priority
- Serendipity
- Stigler's law of eponymy
- Synchronicity
- Twin films
- Zeitgeist
