= Timeline for invention in the arts =

Timelines of inventions display the development and progression of art, design, architecture, music and literature.

== Invention in art, design and architecture ==
dates may be approximations

- 350,000 BCE – Paint was invented by early humans. Pigment and paint-grinding equipment was found in a cave at Twin Rivers near Lusaka, Zambia.
- 31,000 BCE – Representational painting was invented. Murals of stampeding bulls, cantering horses, red bears and woolly rhinoceros are found in the Chauvet Caves in France.
- 22,000 BCE – Sculpture was invented by Paleolithic tribes, who created the female statuette called the Venus of Willendorf, found in near Willendorf, Austria.
- 4000 BCE – Papyrus, the precursor to paper, was invented by the Egyptians by pounding flat woven mats of reeds.
- 2500 BCE – Egyptian blue pigment was invented by Egyptian chemists using a mixture of limestone (calcium oxide), malachite (copper oxide) and quartz (silica) fired to about 800–900 degrees Celsius.
- 500 BCE – Encaustic paints are invented by Greek artists by mixing colored pigments and wax.
- 450 BCE – Depicting the illusion of three-dimensional form on a two-dimensional surface was invented with the chiaroscuro painting technique that employs highlights and shadows.
- 250 BCE – Glassblowing was invented by Syrian craftsmen in Babylonia.
- 105 – Paper was invented by Ts’ai Lun, a Chinese court official.
- 650 – Porcelain was invented by Chinese artists in the Tang dynasty as a fired mixture of kaolin (a clay) and petuntse (a feldspar).
- 1306 – A more naturalistic means of representational painting was invented by Giotto di Bondone using depth, perspective and temporal realism to present a single moment in time.
- 15th century – A cupola, or dome which did not require a framework supporting its curves, was invented by Filippo Brunelleschi. To transport the large stones to the construction site, Brunelleschi invented a unique boat capable of moving heavy cargo upriver and was granted exclusive rights to use his boat to move heavy loads, patent rights.
- 15th century – Linear perspective was invented with work by Filippo Brunelleschi and a treatise on perspective theory by Leon Battista Alberti. Perspective is a method for depicting the illusion of three-dimensional objects on a two-dimensional surface.
- 1420 – The use of a single, consistent light source in painting with figures painted to appear three-dimensional was invented by the Italian artist Masaccio (Tommaso di Giovanni). See his 1427 painting, "Tribute Money".
- 1485 – Sfumato, a painting technique in which an atmospheric or blurry effect is created with minute transitions between color areas, was invented by Leonardo da Vinci. Sfumato is seen in Leonardo's "Virgin on the Rocks" and "Mona Lisa".
- 1503 – Surrealism was invented by Flemish artist Hieronymus Bosch with his triptych "The Garden of Earthly Delights".
- 1774 – Jasperware, a dense vitreous pottery that could be turned on a lathe, was invented by Josiah Wedgwood.
- 1800 - French artist Louis-Léopold Boilly's painting Un Trompe-l'œil introduces the term trompe-l'œil ("trick the eye"), applied to the technique that uses realistic imagery to create the optical illusion that the depicted objects exist in three dimensions, although the "unnamed" technique itself had existed in Greek and Roman times.
- 1816 – The first recorded image was invented by Joseph Nicephore Niepce using a sheet of silver-plated copper sensitized with chlorine or bromine fumes in addition to the iodine vapor.
- 1816 – a resolution contrast technique of painting and drawing was invented by Jean-Auguste-Dominique Ingres, who used it to depict faces in high resolution with the rest of the image in low resolution, as for example in his drawing "Mrs. Charles Badham".
- 1861 – The color photograph was invented by physicist James Clerk Maxwell.
- 1863 – Multiple-subject painting was invented by Édouard Manet. His "Le dejeuner sur l'herbe" presents four disconnected figures not looking at one another, lighted from different directions. Dejeuner sur l'herbe also has a disconnected background-to-foreground perspective that eliminates the middle ground.
- 1865 – Chromolithograph prints were invented by Jules Chéret.
- 1872 – Serial photomontage, the precursor to motion pictures, was invented by Eadweard Muybridge and Étienne-Jules Marey by using multiple cameras to photograph moving objects.
- 1873 – Nonlinear horizon lines were invented by Édouard Manet, eliminating the horizon line in his 1874 painting "Boating".
- 1882 – Multiple-time depiction was invented by Édouard Manet in his "A Bar at the Folies-Bergère", which depicts a bar scene from two points in space at two different moments in time.
- 1884 – Pointillism was invented by Georges Seurat, who created entire paintings using small dots of pure, unmixed color.
- 1888 – A technique of portraying a subject from different perspectives and of distorting subject matter in painting was invented by Paul Cézanne.
- 1891 – A technique of unfreezing time in still images was invented by Claude Monet, who painted the same subject at many different times during the day, showing how it appeared differently largely due to the change in natural light. He painted the cathedral at Rouen at 40 different times of the day, and he painted the same haystack at 20 different moments in a year.
- 1902- A technique of indeterminate time was invented in painting by Paul Cézanne in his painting "Mont Sainte-Victorie", in which the sources and direction of light are not discernible.
- 1902 – The teddy bear was invented by Morris and Rose Michtom based on a cartoon of a bear saved by President Theodore Roosevelt.
- 1903 – The 3-D (three-dimensional) movie was invented by Auguste and Louis Lumière with their one-minute film "L’Arrivée du Train".
- 1904 – Fauvism was invented by Henri Matisse, Maurice de Vlaminck, André Derain and others.
- 1907 – A variety of special effects for film were invented by Georges Méliès in his film Tunneling the English Channel, including stop-motion photography, split-screen photography, stop action animation and the combination of live action with full-scale mechanical backgrounds.
- 1915 – The multistable image was invented by W. E. Hill, with his drawing "My Wife and My Mother-in-Law", an image that can present either a young woman or an older woman.
- 1908 to 1917 – Cubism was invented by Pablo Picasso and Georges Braque. In Cubist artworks, the subject, whether it be a figure or a still life, is broken up and reassembled, and presented from multiple views simultaneously. Cubism revolutionized western art and influenced other art forms like music and literature.
- 1912 – Collage as we know it today was invented by Picasso with his "Still Life with Chair Caning". Attaching a material from the real world that was not ever used in high art into a painting violated what was previously considered the integrity of the artwork. Collage was a new process for making art, it was a new art form, and it expanded the definition of art.
- 1912 – The Construction was invented by Picasso when he created "Guitar" in 1912 by joining parts together. This additive image-making process was new to western sculpture, which was previously made using subtractive processes like carving stone, wood or modeling clay, which may have then been cast in metal.
- 1917 – the Readymade was invented and exhibited by Marcel Duchamp with his work "The Fountain", an upturned urinal signed by the artist. The Readymade expanded the definition of art and of an artist.
- 1917 – De Stijl, a kind of art based on pure geometry, was invented by Theo van Doesburg.
- 1926 – Science fiction movies were invented by Fritz Lang with his movie Metropolis, which incorporates dynamic visual and special effects.
- 1928 – Welded sculpture, a new medium, a new process and a new art form, was invented by Pablo Picasso and Julio Gonzalez, opening up the solid form of sculpture to negative space and transparency.
- 1929 – Film noir was invented by Josef Sternberg with his film Thunderbolt.
- 1932 – The mobile was invented by Alexander Calder.
- 1936 – A device that greatly speeds up the process of making cartoons and enables them to appear more realistic was invented and patented by Walt Disney, who used it to create the classic Snow White and the Seven Dwarfs in 1937. Refer to US Patent 2,201,689.
- 1947–50 – Painting was reinvented by Jackson Pollock, whose novel method of spontaneously dripping and splattering paint from a can onto unscratched canvas laid out on the floor brought about an expanded understanding of pure abstraction and of art.
- 1948 – The Glass House by the architect Philip Johnson reduced building down to its most basic elements: a horizontal slab on the ground, vertical supports, a flat roof and transparent glass wrapped around it.
- 1952 – Stain painting, in which liquid paint soaks and bleeds into the fabric of unprimed canvas, was invented by Joan Miró, James Brooks and Jackson Pollock, who influenced Helen Frankenthaler as seen in her painting "Mountains and Sea" of 1952.
- 1959 – The first public "happening" was produced by Allan Kaprow at the Reuben Gallery in New York. A happening is defined by Kaprow as a choreographed event that facilitates interactions between objects including performers and visitors. Happenings were influenced by Jackson Pollock's process of action painting, Dada and the teachings of John Cage on chance and indeterminacy.

== Invention in music ==
Music has been expanded by invention over the course of thousands of years.

Timeline - dates may be approximations

- 35,000 BCE - The first bone flutes were made in Germany.
- 8800 BCE - The first bone flutes which could play the standard pitch A6 were made in China.
- 5000 BCE - The first flutes were made in India out of wood.
- 3000 BCE - The first string instrument, the guqin, was invented in China.
- 619 - The orchestra was invented in the Chinese royal courts with hundreds of musicians.
- 855 - Polyphonic music was invented.
- 910 - The musical score was invented by the musician Hucbaldus. He also invented a staff that had an indefinite number of lines.
- 1025 - Musical notes were invented by Guido of Arezzo, named UT, RE, MI, FA, SO and LA. Later in the 16th century UT was changed to DO and TI was added. Lines/staves to space printed notes were also added.
- 1250 - Rounds, songs sung in harmony, were invented; the first known example is the song Sumer is icumen in.
- 1607 - A tonal system that gave the recitative a more flexible accompaniment was invented, revolutionizing music in the first opera masterpiece, Orfeo, by Claudio Monteverdi, a composer, musician and singer.
- 1696 - The metronome, a device for beating time, was invented by Etienne Loulie, a musician, pedagogue and musical theorist.
- 1698–1708 - The piano was invented by Bartolomeo Cristofori
- 1821 - The harmonica, probably one of the most versatile instruments ever invented, and very closely aligned to the human voice, was invented by Christian Friedrich Ludwig Buschmann, for use with classical music.
- 1829 - The accordion, a portable reed instrument, was invented by Damian.
- 1835 - The tuba proper was first patented by Prussian bandmaster Wilhelm Wieprecht and German instrument builder Johann Gottfried Moritz.
- 1841 - The saxophone was invented by Adolphe Sax, an instrument maker.
- 1880 - Tango music was invented by the Argentinians, combining African, Indian and Spanish rhythms.
- 1919 - The first electronic music instrument, the theremin, was invented by Lev Theremin. It is played by moving one's hands near an antenna.
- 1922 - Muzak, engineered music without vocals, tempo changes or brass instruments, was invented by Brig. General George Owen Squier.
- 1932 - The first electric guitar, the Frying pan, was invented by George Beauchamp.
- 1953 - Rock and Roll was invented by the musician Bill Haley with Crazy Man Crazy, which combined guitars, saxophones, piano, bass and snare drums. Haley was imitating African American musicians such as Chuck Berry.
- 1957 - Computer-assisted musical composition was invented with the creation of Illiac Suite for String Quartet by scientists at the University of Illinois in Urbana.
- 1964 - The Moog Synthesizer was invented by Robert Moog.
- 1974 - The Chapman Stick was invented by Emmett Chapman.

== Invention in literature ==
Literature has been reinvented throughout history as shown below:

- 1950 BC - The novel was invented with a narrative form. The first novel, Story of Sinuhe, is about a prince of Egypt who flees after a court killing, is saved in the desert by a Bedouin tribe, and marries the eldest daughter of a king. Some people see Story of Sinuhe as the precursor of the story of Moses in the Bible.
- 675 BC - The heroic ballad was invented by Stesichorus of Sicily.
- 553 - Scandal literature was invented by Procopius in Anecdota.
- 808 - Copying written works by printing was invented by the Chinese, who created The Diamond Sutra, a seven-page paper scroll printed with woodblocks.
- 1022 - The romance novel was invented by Murasaki Shikibu, a Japanese noblewoman who wrote Genji the Shining One.
- 1657 - The science fiction novel was invented by Savinien Cyrano de Bergerac, who wrote Les etas et empires de la lune about a trip to the moon.

== Invention in the performing arts ==
- 2500 BCE - Theater was invented by Egyptian priests with their annual ritual the "Abydos Passion Play" about the god Osiris. The Ikhernofret hieroglyphic stone dating from 1868 BCE provides an account of the play by a participant listing eight acts.
- 2200 BCE - Mythic storytelling was invented by Sumerian priests with a story about the flooding of the earth involving many Gods and pious King Ziusdra.
- 1800 BCE - The derivative work was invented by the Babylonians when they adapted and expanded the flood story in their "Epic of Gilgamesh", which involves a pious King Atrahasis.
- 450 BCE - Mime was invented by Sophron of Syracuse.
- 1597 - Opera was invented by Jacopo Peri with Dafne. Peri was an Italian composer and singer.
- 1780 - Bolero dance was invented by Sebastiano Carezo, a Spanish dancer.
- 1816 - Literary horror was invented by Mary Shelley, who wrote Frankenstein.
- 1833 - Minstrel shows were invented by Thomas Dartmouth "Daddy" Rice.
- 1843 - The mystery novel was invented by Edgar Allan Poe, who wrote "The Gold-Bug".
- 1843 - The photographically illustrated book was invented by Anna Atkins with her book British Algae: Cyanotype Impressions.
- 1857 - Writing in which the author conceals a single narrator's perspective and uses multiple other points of view was first done by Gustave Flaubert in Madame Bovary.
- 1880 - Tango dance was invented by the Argentinians, combining African, Indian and Spanish rhythms.
- 1895 - The serial comic strip was invented by publisher Joseph Pulitzer with The Yellow Kid in the New World Newspaper.
- 1922 - Radio drama was invented when Eugene Walter's play The Wolf was broadcast by WGY, a station in Schenectady, New York. WGY later created a radio show, The WGY Players, that presented radio adaptations of popular plays.
- 1993 - A system that allows the wearer of specially designed shoes to lean forward beyond his center of gravity and appear to defy gravity was invented and patented by Michael Jackson, Michael Bush and Dennis Tompkins. Michael Jackson used it in performances. Refer to US Patent No. 5,255,452.
