= Voice exchange =

In music, the repetition of a contrapuntal passage with the voices' parts exchanged

In music, especially Schenkerian analysis, a voice exchange (German: Stimmtausch; also called voice interchange) is the repetition of a contrapuntal passage with the voices' parts exchanged; for instance, the melody of one part appears in a second part and vice versa. It differs from invertible counterpoint in that there is no octave displacement; therefore it always involves some voice crossing. If scored for equal instruments or voices, it may be indistinguishable from a repeat, although because a repeat does not appear in any of the parts, it may make the music more interesting for the musicians. It is a characteristic feature of rounds, although not usually called such.

Patterns of voice exchange are sometimes schematized using letters for melodic patterns. A double voice exchange has the pattern:

Voice 1:  a b
Voice 2:  b a

A triple exchange would thus be written:

Voice 1:  a b c
Voice 2:  c a b
Voice 3:  b c a

The first use of the term "Stimmtausch" was in 1903-4 in an article by Friedrich Ludwig, while its English calque was first used in 1949 by Jacques Handschin. The term is also used, with a related but distinct meaning, in Schenkerian theory.

"When a piece is entirely conceived according to the system of Stimmtausch, it belongs to the rondellus type."

== History ==
Voice exchange appeared in the 12th-century repertory of the Saint Martial school as a consequence of imitation. Voice exchange first became common in the Notre Dame school, who used both double and triple exchanges in organa and conductus (in particular the wordless caudae). In fact, Richard Hoppin regarded voice exchange as "the basic device from which the Notre Dame composers evolved ways of organizing and integrating the simultaneous melodies of polyphony," and of considerable importance as a means of symmetry and design in polyphonic music as well as starting point for more complex contrapuntal devices. The importance was not lost on theorists of the time, either, as Johannes de Garlandia gave an example, which he called "repetitio diverse vocis," and noted in "three- and four-part organa, and conductus, and in many other things."

In Pérotin's four-part organum "Sederunt principes", sections that are exchanged vary considerably in length, from two to more than ten measures, and parts that are exchanged are sometimes nested (i.e. there is a brief voice exchange among two parts within a larger section which subsequently is repeated using a voice exchange). The elaborate patterns of voice exchange in pieces like "Sederunt" prove that Perotin composed them as a whole, not by successively adding voices.

In the 13th century, the technique was used by English composers of the Worcester school as a structural device. In the genre rondellus, as described by the theorist Walter Odington (c. 1300), the central part of the piece was based entirely on voice exchange. Ordinarily, but not always, the text is exchanged along with the melody. It also appears in the lower parts (pes) of "Sumer Is Icumen In", while the upper parts always include a new melodic phrase instead of a true voice exchange.

Voice exchange gradually died out after 1300, due to the gradual separation of voice ranges and the expansion of the ambitus of a composition. However, it occasionally made limited appearances in simple polyphony of the fifteenth and sixteenth centuries and was, for example, common in the upper parts of Baroque trio sonatas.

== Use in Schenkerian theory ==
Voice exchange is also used in Schenkerian analysis to refer to a pitch class exchange involving two voices across registers, one of which is usually the bass. In this sense, it is a common secondary structural feature found in the music of a wide variety of composers. In analyses, this is represented by two crossing lines with double arrowheads indicating the exchanged pitches. A common exchange of this sort involves a progression of a third using a passing tone, the exchange notated by the interval succession 10-8-6 (if this is with the bass, the third chord is a first inversion of the first). This is in effect a prolongation of the third (generally as part of a triad), a preservation of the harmony across a time span. Another type of exchange has the interval succession 10-10-6-6 (or 6-6-10-10) and involves a pair of notes exchanged across parts.

== See also ==
- Pervading imitation
- Round (music)
- Voice crossing
