= Viel Glück und viel Segen =

German congratulatory round

- Congratulatory round by Werner Gneis
- English: Much happiness and blessing
- Written: 1930
- Text: by Werner Gneist
- Language: German

"Viel Glück und viel Segen" (Much happiness and blessing) is a round in German, with text and music written by Werner Gneist in 1930. It is often sung as a congratulation and blessing for birthdays and anniversaries. The song is included in many songbooks, and is regarded as one of the most common birthday songs in German.

== History ==
The song "Viel Glück und viel Segen" has a short text in four lines, wishing happiness and blessing on all ways, including health and cheerfulness. Werner Gneist may have known several earlier short songs that used similar wording.

Used for congratulations and blessings on birthdays and anniversaries, this song is often sung as a round. It is printed in songbooks, including several for children, as one the most popular birthday song in German.

== Text and music ==
Much happiness and blessing, / wherever you go; / health and joy / be included, too.
