= Lasst uns miteinander =

Christian song

- Round
- English: Let us Sing Together
- Language: German
- Melody: by Peter van Woerden
- Composed: 1960

"Lasst uns miteinander" ("Let Us Sing Together") is a round for four parts to a text originally in German. The text has been passed orally while the melody was composed by Peter van Woerden in 1960. The round is part of many hymnals and songbooks, especially of collections for children. Some songbooks have both a sacred and a secular version, also in English.

== History ==
The text of "Lasst uns miteinander" has been passed orally. The melody of a round for four parts was written by Peter van Woerden in 1960.

The round is part of many songbooks, especially of collections for children. Some songbook provide an English version. The melody is relatively easy, and the round can be sung even by small children. It is suitable to begin events. It has been published with both sacred and secular text; they all have in common to call for some action together, such as singing playing and praising the Lord in a sacred version for children, the same but praying instead of playing for adults, und dancing in a secular version that ends on "olé" instead of "the Lord".
