= Edisonian approach =

Approach to invention characterized by trial and error discovery

The Edisonian approach to invention is characterized by trial and error discovery rather than a systematic theoretical approach. An often quoted example of the Edisonian approach is the successful but protracted process Thomas Edison is reported to have used to develop a practical incandescent light bulb. Inventor Nikola Tesla is quoted as saying "[Edison's] method was inefficient in the extreme, for an immense ground had to be covered to get anything at all unless blind chance intervened and, at first, I was almost a sorry witness of his doings, knowing that just a little theory and calculation would have saved him 90 percent of the labour" (Wills I. (2019) The Edisonian Method: Trial and Error. In: Thomas Edison: Success and Innovation through Failure. Studies in History and Philosophy of Science).

== Trial and error (hunt and try) ==
Based on detailed study of his notebooks a number of scholars have pointed out that Edison generally resorted to trial and error in the absence of, or lack of awareness of, adequate theories. For example, in developing the carbon microphone (or carbon grain transmitter) that became the basis of telephones of the next hundred years, Edison and his co-workers tried hundreds of substances, finally settling on lamp black as the variable resistance medium. Edison could not use theory to solve this problem because, as Gorman and Carlson note, at the time "no one had yet developed a chemical theory that Edison could have used to identify a form of carbon with the electrical properties he wanted" (Gorman and Carlson, 1990).

Edison was not alone in using trial and error (more accurately termed by Hughes as "hunt and try") because he, like others, was working at the edges of contemporary theory. Thomas Midgley (who held a PhD and was the inventor of tetraethyl lead and halogenated hydrocarbon refrigerants) said of trial and error, "the trick is to turn a wild goose chase into a fox hunt" (quoted in Hughes 2004).

Edison used a "bottom-up theoretical approach" when developing electric lighting, undertaking detailed analysis of the whole electric lighting system based on Joule's and Ohm's laws. This led him to conclude that to be economically successful he had to produce a high resistance lamp (around 100 ohms). (Friedel and Israel 1987) Once he had established the need for a high resistance lamp he was faced with a lack of optical emission theories to describe the behaviour of materials when heated to incandescence. It was then that he embarked on a systematic search for a suitable material and for the techniques to manufacture it in economic volumes.

== Edison's method ==
Historian Thomas Hughes (1977) describes the features of Edison's method. In summary, they are:

- Hughes says, "In formulating problem-solving ideas, he was inventing; in developing inventions, his approach was akin to engineering; and in looking after financing and manufacturing and other post-invention and development activities, he was innovating."
- Edison "Adroitly chose" problems that made use of what he already knew.
- Edison's method was to invent systems rather than components of systems. Edison did not just invent a light bulb, he invented an economically viable system of lighting including its generators, cables, metering and so on.
- Edison invented by repeatedly trying devices in more complex environments to progressively approximate their final use conditions.
- Edison blended invention with economics. His electric lighting system was designed to be an economic competitor with gas lighting.
- Edison assembled and organized the resources that would lead to successful inventions:
  - Men with skills that would aid the task.
  - Equipment – machines, instruments, chemicals etc.
  - Literature on the subject. He started a project with a thorough literature review.
  - An environment where the purpose was invention not something else like manufacturing.
- Edison was a charismatic leader who drew on the ideas of those who worked with him.
- Edison was obsessive in his pursuit of outcomes, not allowing things like a lack of sleep, or cost, to deter him.
- Contrary to common opinion Edison made use of the scientific method but in a way that was limited to the task at hand and did not seek to develop generalized theories.
- A key to Edison's intellectual approach was to always doubt and never take things for granted.
- Edison made effective use of metaphors when picturing his inventions.
- He had a significant ability to grasp quantitative relationships despite his limited mathematical training.
- He worked by conceiving an idea and working towards achieving it.
- Edison (And his co-workers) possessed excellent manual dexterity.
- Edison was also very effective at sketching, enabling him to conceive and manipulate his ideas on paper.
- Edison did use hunt and try extensively but only when no theory existed and in a systematic rather than random manner.
- Edison was distinguished by his ability to deal with complex change.

== Edison on literature reviews ==
Edison is quoted as saying, "When I want to discover something, I begin by reading up everything that has been done along that line in the past - that's what all these books in the library are for. I see what has been accomplished at great labor and expense in the past. I gather data of many thousands of experiments as a starting point, and then I make thousands more."

== See also ==
- Creativity techniques
- The heroic theory of invention and scientific development
