= Friedrich Ludwig (musicologist) =

German historian and musicologist (1872–1930)

Friedrich Ludwig (8 May 1872 – 3 October 1930) was a German historian, musicologist, and college instructor. His name is closely associated with the exploration and rediscovery of medieval music in the 20th century, particularly the compositional techniques of the Ars Nova and the isorhythmic motet.

== Life ==
Ludwig was born in Potsdam, and after completing the abitur at the Victoria-Gymnasium (Now Helmholtz-Gymnasium, Potsdam), he studied historiography with Harry Bresslau at the University of Strasbourg, where he earned a doctorate in 1896. He owed his musical education on one hand to Gustav Jacobsthal, the only full-time professor of historical musicology in Germany at the time, and on the other hand to philosopher-organist Albert Schweitzer and composer Hans Pfitzner, both of whom he met in Strasbourg where he settled. For about a decade, Ludwig made numerous trips throughout Europe to investigate the sources of medieval music. He joined the faculty of Strasbourg University upon Jacobsthal's retirement in 1905, first as a lecturer, and in 1910 as an associate professor of music history. He was expelled from Strasbourg when it fell into French hands at the end of the First World War. In 1920, he became an associate professor at the University of Göttingen, where he served as Rector in 1929/30.

== Works ==
Friedrich Ludwig belonged to the school of thought among cultural historians that did not ascribe to the Romantic view that Baroque Polyphony was the only type of polyphony of highest worth; rather, he sought to explore its historical development and evolution, leading to a critical reassessment of earlier music. These researches have made the practice and theory of music of the Middle Ages accessible. His research area was music before Palestrina-style polyphony; namely, the Ars Antiqua, Ars Nova, and the polyphony of the Franco-Flemish school. As a historian, Ludwig was already familiar with the cultural unity of Europe in the Late Middle Ages, and he approached it through the narrative and source-based methodology of Leopold von Ranke, of whom Ludwig's teacher Bresslau was a disciple. These methods had, for instance, moved Slavic cultures into a new perspective. In contrast to the prevailing view among music historians of the 19th century - a view epitomized in Wilhelm Friedrich Hegel's Phenomenology of the Spirit (1807) asserting that music is an art in and of itself, Ludwig followed a systematic method to explore the relationships between music and other cultural phenomena such as architecture and literature, finding in it unity through the poetry of medieval languages. For this purpose, he used the philology of High Middle German, the Romance languages, and medieval Latin, the chorale, and historic chronicles. He made stylistic comparison of primary sources to date musical works, and introduced these methods to music historiography.

Ludwig's contributions to musical scholarship include his investigations into Organum, deciphering early neumatic notation (square note notation), the discovery of Rhythmic modes in the unison songs of the 13th century, and the systematic representation of compositions of the Notre Dame School and the motets of the Ars Nova. He transcribed many multi-part works of the 15th century and published them in critical editions. Ludwig discovered the compositional principal of isorhythm – a term he coined. He also coined the term Stimmtausch.

== Selected bibliography ==
- Die mehrstimmige Musik des 14. Jahrhunderts. in: Sammelbände der Internationalen Musikgesellschaft. vol. 4, 1902/03, pp. 16–69
- Die 50 Beispiele Coussemaker’s aus der Handschrift von Montpellier. In: Sammelbände der Internationalen Musikgesellschaft. Vol. 5, 1903/04, pp. 177–244
- Die mehrstimmige Musik der ältesten Epoche im Dienste der Liturgie. Ein mehrstimmiges Sankt-Jakobs-Offizium des 12. Jahrhunderts. In: Kirchenmusikalisches Jahrbuch. Vol 19, 1905, pp. 1–16
- Über die Entstehung und die erste Entwicklung der lateinischen und französischen Motette in musikalischer Beziehung. In: Sammelbände der Internationalen Musikgesellschaft. Vol 7, 1905/06, pp. 514–528
- Die Aufgaben der Forschung auf dem Gebiete der mittelalterlichen Musikgeschichte. Strasbourg 1906
- Die mehrstimmigen Werke der Handschrift Engelberg 314. In: Kirchenmusikalisches Jahrbuch. Vol 21, 1908, pp. 48–61
- Die liturgischen Organa Leonins und Perotins. In: Festschrift für Hugo Riemann. Leipzig 1909, pp. 200–213
- Die mehrstimmige Musik des 11. und 12. Jahrhunderts. In: Kongress-Bericht zur Haydn-Zentenarfeier. Vienna 1909, pp. 101–108
- Repertorium organorum recentioris et motetorum vetustissimi stili. I. Catalogue raisonné der Quellen, Abt. 1. Handschriften in Quadratnotation. Niemeyer, Halle 1910
- Perotinus Magnus. In Archiv für Musikwissenschaft. Vol 3, 1921, pp. 361–370
- Die Quellen der Motetten ältesten Stils. In: Archiv für Musikwissenschaft. Vol 5, 1923, pp. 185–222 and vol. 6, 1924, pp. 245ff.
- Die geistliche nichtliturgische, weltliche einstimmige und die mehrstimmige Musik des Mittelalters bis zum Anfang des 15. Jahrhunderts. In: Guido Adler (Ed.): Handbuch der Musikgeschichte. dtv, Munich 1924/1930, pp. 157–195
- Die mehrstimmige Messe des 14. Jahrhunderts. In: Archiv für Musikwissenschaft. Vol. 7 1925, pp. 417–435 and Vol. 8, 1926, pp. 130
- Versuch einer Übertragung der Motetten Herenthals Nr. 4 und 5. In the Zeitschrift für Musikwissenschaft. Vol 8, 1925/26, pp. 196–200
- Beethovens Leonore. 1930
