= Pervading imitation =

Pervading imitation refers to a way of organizing a piece of music in which all voices sing the same melodic material in sequence.

Voices enter one by one at points of imitation and sing the same melodic material although they begin at different pitch levels.

Pervading imitation emerged in the early Renaissance and was widely used by composers like Josquin in Missa pange lingua, and Thomas Crecquillon.

== See also ==
- Round (music)
- Voice crossing
- Voice exchange
