= Froh zu sein bedarf es wenig =

Round composed by August Mühling

"Froh zu sein bedarf es wenig" (It takes little to be happy) is a round in German from the 19th century, composed by August Mühling.

== History ==
The text has been found several times from the 18th century, earliest in 1770 in Christian Felix Weiße's libretto of Johann Adam Hiller's opera Die Jagd.

The composition is by August Mühling. He is supposed to published it as part of his Gesänge, Op. 5, but it is not found as part of the first edition of 1812.

== Text and melody ==
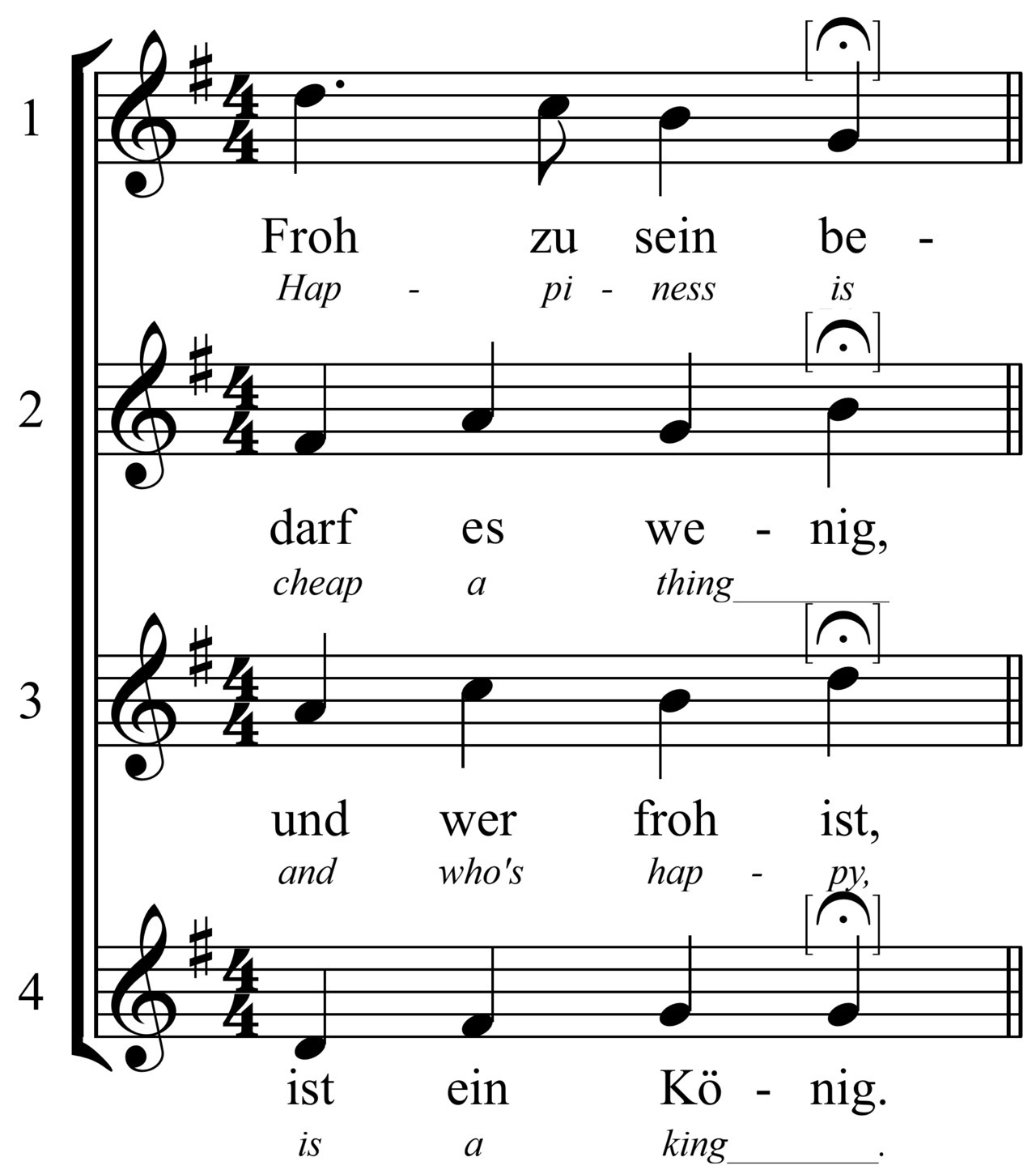
Instrumental Vocal

Froh zu sein bedarf es wenig,
und wer froh ist, ist ein König!

Translation

Happiness is cheap a thing,
and who's happy, is a king.

== Trivia ==
- This is a popular birthday party song in German speaking countries.
- Due to the simplicity of its melody this canon is a staple in German Kindergartens and elementary schools.
- Rolf Zuckowski has written an audio play about it.
- Der title of Hera Lind's 1992 novel Frau zu sein bedarf es wenig references the canon.
- Die medieval rock band In Extremo modified the text into their 2008 song Frei zu sein (Being Free).
