= Heroic theory of invention and scientific development =

The heroic theory of invention and scientific development is the view that the principal authors of inventions and scientific discoveries are unique heroic individuals—i.e., "great scientists" or "geniuses".

== Competing hypothesis ==
A competing hypothesis (that of multiple discovery) is that most inventions and scientific discoveries are made independently and simultaneously by multiple inventors and scientists.

The multiple-discovery hypothesis may be most patently exemplified in the evolution of mathematics, since mathematical knowledge is highly unified and any advances need, as a general rule, to be built from previously established results through a process of deduction. Thus, the development of infinitesimal calculus into a systematic discipline did not occur until the development of analytic geometry, the former being credited to both Sir Isaac Newton and Gottfried Leibniz, and the latter to both René Descartes and Pierre de Fermat.

== See also ==
- Genius
- Great man theory
- Grand narrative
- Hive mind
- List of multiple discoveries
- Multiple discovery
- People known as the father or mother of something
- Scientific priority
- Scientific theory
- Discovery and invention controversies
