= Great man theory =

Approach to the study of history

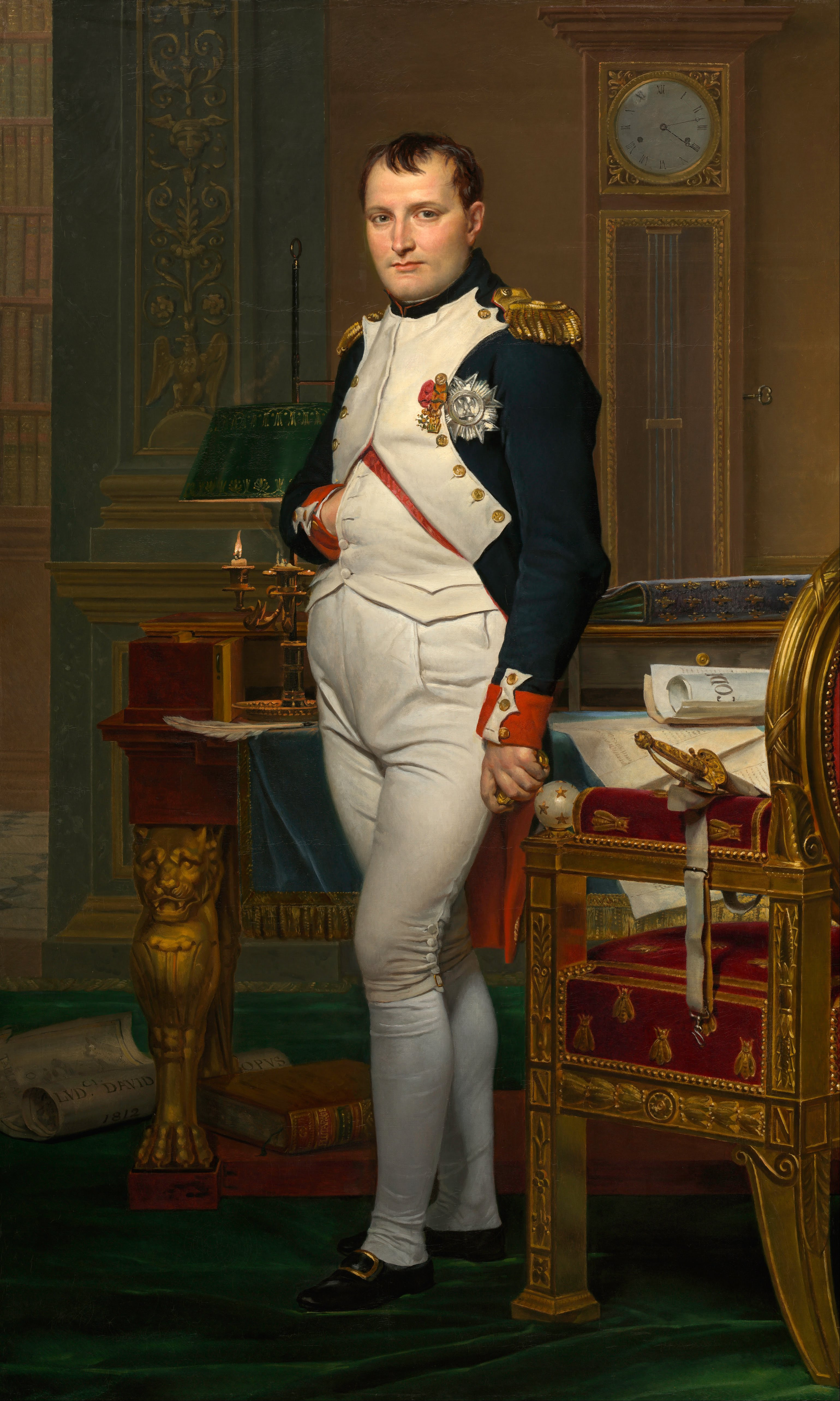
Napoleon, a typical great man, said to have created the "Napoleonic" era through his military and political genius

The great man theory is an approach to the study of history popularised in the 19th century. According to it, history can be largely explained by the impact of great men, or heroes: highly influential and unique individuals who, due to their natural attributes, such as superior intellect, heroic courage, extraordinary leadership abilities or divine inspiration, have a decisive historical effect. The theory is primarily attributed to the Scottish essayist, historian and philosopher Thomas Carlyle, who gave a series of lectures on heroism in 1840, later published as On Heroes, Hero-Worship, & the Heroic in History, in which he states:

Universal History, the history of what man has accomplished in this world, is at bottom the History of the Great Men who have worked here. They were the leaders of men, these great ones; the modellers, patterns, and in a wide sense creators, of whatsoever the general mass of men contrived to do or to attain; all things that we see standing accomplished in the world are properly the outer material result, the practical realisation and embodiment, of Thoughts that dwelt in the Great Men sent into the world: the soul of the whole world's history, it may justly be considered, were the history of these.

This theory is usually contrasted with people's history, which emphasises the life of the masses creating overwhelming waves of smaller events which carry leaders along with them. Another contrasting school is historical materialism.

== Overview ==
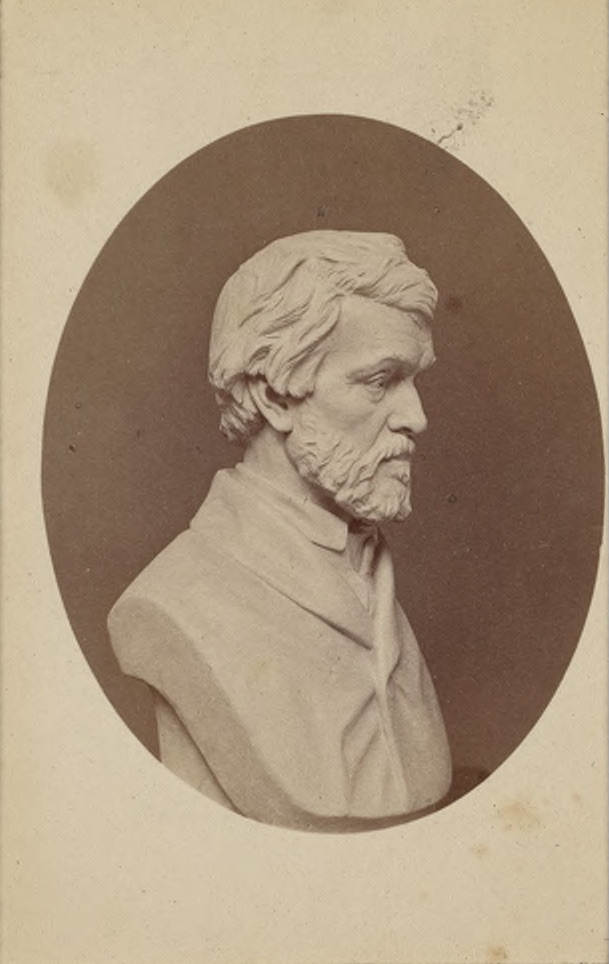
Bust of Thomas Carlyle by Thomas Woolner

Carlyle stated that "The History of the world is but the Biography of great men", reflecting his belief that heroes shape history through both their personal attributes and divine inspiration. In his book Heroes and Hero-Worship, Carlyle saw history as having turned on the decisions, works, ideas and characters of "heroes", giving detailed analysis of six types: The hero as divinity (such as Odin), prophet (such as Muhammad), poet (such as William Shakespeare), priest (such as Martin Luther), man of letters (such as Jean-Jacques Rousseau), and king (such as Napoleon). Carlyle also argued that the study of great men was "profitable" to one's own heroic side; that by examining the lives led by such heroes, one could not help but uncover something about one's own true nature.

As Sidney Hook notes, a common misinterpretation of the theory is that "all factors in history, save great men, were inconsequential", whereas Carlyle is instead claiming that great men are the decisive factor, owing to their unique genius. Hook then goes on to emphasize this uniqueness to illustrate the point: "Genius is not the result of compounding talent. How many battalions are the equivalent of a Napoleon? How many minor poets will give us a Shakespeare? How many run of the mine scientists will do the work of an Einstein?"

The American scholar Frederick Adams Woods supported the great man theory in his work The Influence of Monarchs: Steps in a New Science of History. Woods investigated 386 rulers in Western Europe from the 12th century until the French Revolution in the late 18th century and their influence on the course of historical events.

The Great Man approach to history was most fashionable with professional historians in the 19th century; a popular work of this school is the Encyclopædia Britannica Eleventh Edition (1911) which contains lengthy and detailed biographies about the great men of history, but very few general or social histories. For example, all information on the post-Roman "Migrations Period" of European history is compiled under the biography of Attila the Hun. This heroic view of history was also strongly endorsed by some philosophers, such as Léon Bloy, Søren Kierkegaard, Oswald Spengler and Max Weber.

Georg Wilhelm Friedrich Hegel, proceeding from providentialist theory, argued that "what is real is reasonable" and that world-historical individuals are the World-Spirit's agents. Hegel wrote: "Such are great historical men—whose own particular aims involve those large issues which are the will of the World-Spirit." Thus, according to Hegel, a great man does not create historical reality himself but only uncovers the inevitable future.

In Untimely Meditations, Friedrich Nietzsche writes that "the goal of humanity lies in its highest specimens". Although Nietzsche's body of work shows some overlap with Carlyle's line of thought, Nietzsche expressly rejected Carlyle's hero cult in Ecce Homo.

=== Assumptions ===
This theory rests on two main assumptions:

1. Every great leader is born already possessing certain traits that will enable them to rise and lead on instinct.
2. The need for them has to be great for these traits to then arise, allowing them to lead.

This theory, and history, claims these great leaders as heroes that were able to rise against the odds to defeat rivals while inspiring followers along the way. Theorists say that these leaders were then born with a specific set of traits and attributes that make them ideal candidates for leadership and roles of authority and power. This theory relies then heavily on born rather than made – nature rather than nurture – and cultivates the idea that those in power deserve to lead and shouldn't be questioned because they have the unique traits that make them suited for the position.

== Responses ==
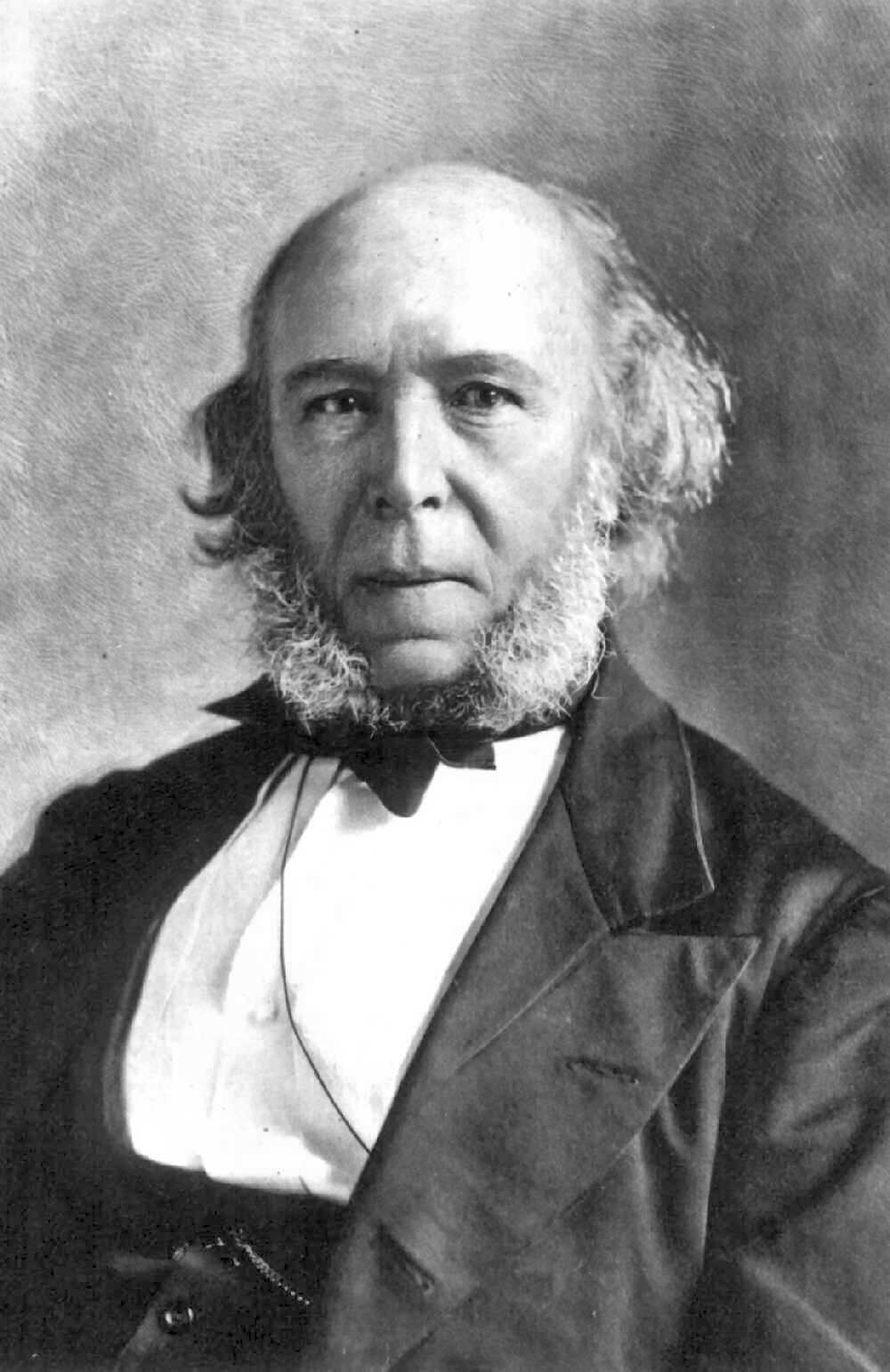
Herbert Spencer was a contemporary critic of Carlyle's great man theory.

=== Herbert Spencer's critique ===
One of the most forceful critics of Carlyle's formulation of the great man theory was Herbert Spencer, who believed that attributing historical events to the decisions of individuals was an unscientific position. He believed that the men Carlyle supposed "great men" are merely products of their social environment:

You must admit that the genesis of a great man depends on the long series of complex influences which has produced the race in which he appears, and the social state into which that race has slowly grown. ... Before he can remake his society, his society must make him.

— Herbert Spencer, The Study of Sociology

=== William James' defense ===
William James, in his 1880 lecture "Great Men, Great Thoughts, and the Environment", published in the Atlantic Monthly, forcefully defended Carlyle and refuted Spencer, condemning what James viewed as an "impudent", "vague", and "dogmatic" argument.

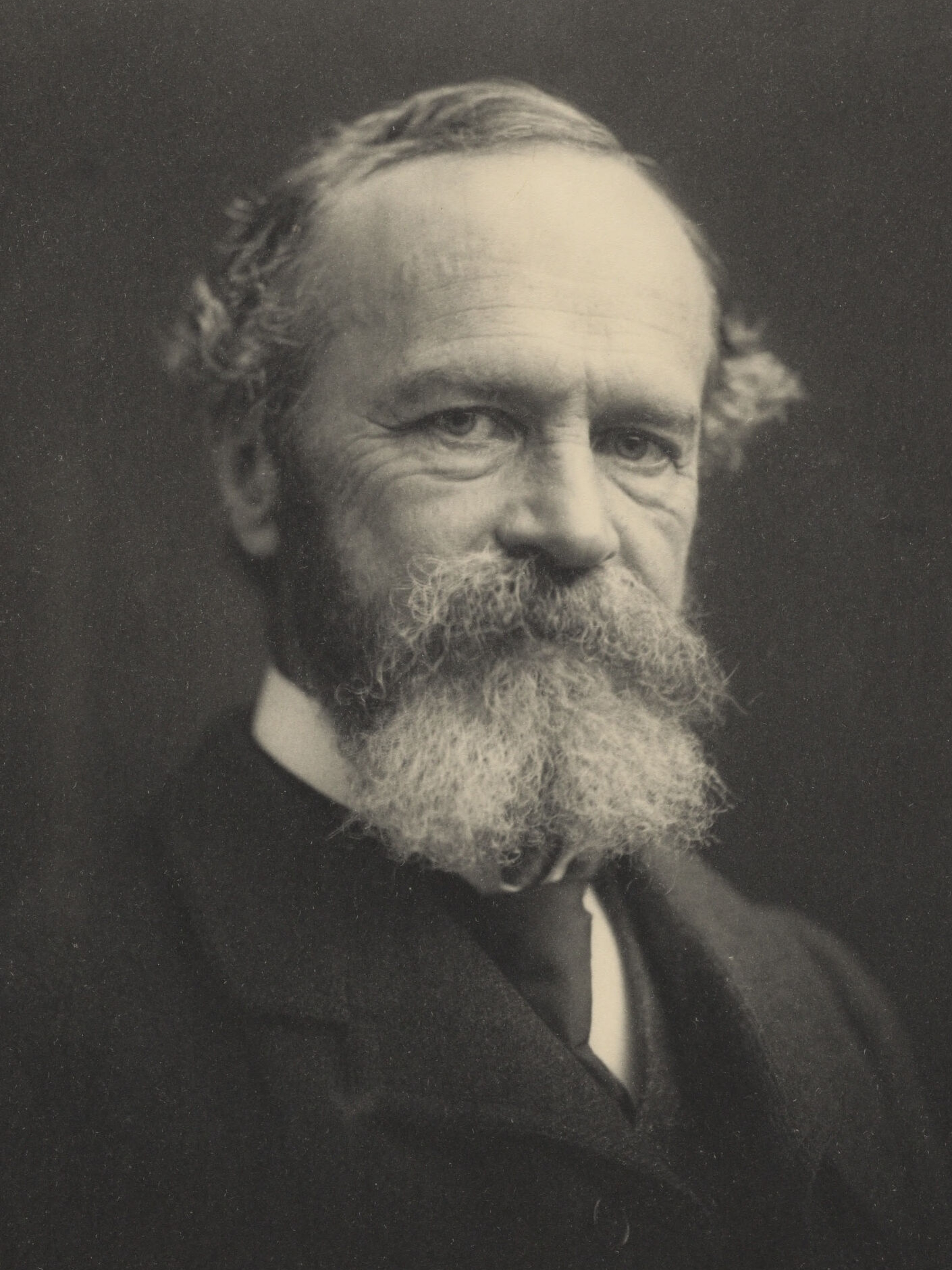
William James was a 19th-century philosopher and psychologist.

James' defence of the great man theory can be summarized as follows: The unique physiological nature of the individual is the deciding factor in making the great man, who, in turn, is the deciding factor in changing his environment in a unique way, without which the new environment would not have come to be, wherein the extent and nature of this change is also dependent on the reception of the environment to this new stimulus. To begin his argument, he first sardonically claims that these inherent physiological qualities have as much to do with "social, political, geographical [and] anthropological conditions" as the "conditions of the crater of Vesuvius has to do with the flickering of this gas by which I write".

James argues that genetic anomalies in the brains of these great men are the decisive factor by introducing an original influence into their environment. They might therefore offer original ideas, discoveries, inventions and perspectives which "would not, in the mind of another individual, have engendered just that conclusion ... It flashes out of one brain, and no other, because the instability of that brain is such as to tip and upset itself in just that particular direction."

James then argues that these spontaneous variations of genius, i.e. the great men, which are causally independent of their social environment, subsequently influence that environment which in turn will either preserve or destroy the newly encountered variations in a form of evolutionary selection. If the great man is preserved then the environment is changed by his influence in "an entirely original and peculiar way. He acts as a ferment, and changes its constitution, just as the advent of a new zoological species changes the faunal and floral equilibrium of the region in which it appears." Each ferment, each great man, exerts a new influence on their environment which is either embraced or rejected and if embraced will in turn shape the crucible for the selection process of future geniuses.

In the words of William James, "If we were to remove these geniuses or alter their idiosyncrasies, what increasing uniformities would the environment exhibit?" James challenges Spencer or anyone else to provide a reply. According to James, there are two distinct factors driving social evolution: personal agents and the impact of their unique qualities on the overall course of events.

He thus concludes: "Both factors are essential to change. The community stagnates without the impulse of the individual. The impulse dies away without the sympathy of the community."

=== Other responses ===
Before the 19th century, Blaise Pascal begins his Three Discourses on the Condition of the Great (written, it seems, for a young duke) by telling the story of a castaway on an island whose inhabitants take him for their missing king. He defends in his parable of the shipwrecked king, that the legitimacy of the greatness of great men is fundamentally custom and chance. A coincidence that gives birth to him in the right place with noble parents and arbitrary custom deciding, for example, on an unequal distribution of wealth in favour of the nobles.

Leo Tolstoy's War and Peace features criticism of great-man theories as a recurring theme in the philosophical digressions. According to Tolstoy, the significance of great individuals is imaginary; as a matter of fact they are only "history's slaves", realising the decree of Providence.

Jacob Burckhardt affirmed the historical existence of great men in politics, even excusing the rarity among them to possess "greatness of soul", or magnanimity: "Contemporaries believe that if people will only mind their own business political morality will improve of itself and history will be purged of the crimes of the 'great men'. These optimists forget that the common people too are greedy and envious and when resisted tend to turn to collective violence." Burckhardt predicted that the belittling of great men would lead to a lowering of standards and rise in mediocrity generally.

Mark Twain suggests in his essay "The United States of Lyncherdom" that "moral cowardice" is "the commanding feature of the make-up of 9,999 men in the 10,000" and that "from the beginning of the world no revolt against a public infamy or oppression has ever been begun but by the one daring man in the 10,000, the rest timidly waiting, and slowly and reluctantly joining, under the influence of that man and his fellows from the other ten thousands."

In 1926 William Fielding Ogburn, an American sociologist, noted that Great Men history was being challenged by newer interpretations that focused on wider social forces. While not seeking to deny that individuals could have a role or show exceptional qualities, he saw Great Men as inevitable products of productive cultures. He noted for example that if Isaac Newton had not lived, calculus would have still been discovered by Gottfried Leibniz, and suspected that if neither man had lived, it would have been discovered by someone else. Among modern critics of the theory, Sidney Hook is supportive of the idea; he gives credit to those who shape events through their actions, and his book The Hero in History is devoted to the role of the hero and in history and influence of the outstanding persons.

In the introduction to a new edition of Heroes and Hero-Worship, David R. Sorensen notes the modern decline in support for Carlyle's theory in particular but also for "heroic distinction" in general. He cites Robert K. Faulkner as an exception, a proponent of Aristotelian magnanimity who in his book The Case for Greatness: Honorable Ambition and Its Critics, criticises the political bias in discussions on greatness and heroism, stating: "the new liberalism's antipathy to superior statesmen and to human excellence is peculiarly zealous, parochial, and antiphilosophic."

Ian Kershaw wrote in 1998 that "The figure of Hitler, whose personal attributes – distinguished from his political aura and impact – were scarcely noble, elevating or enriching, posed self-evident problems for such a tradition." Some historians like Joachim Fest responded by arguing that Hitler had a "negative greatness". By contrast, Kershaw rejects the great man theory and argues that it is more important to study wider political and social factors to explain the history of Nazi Germany. Kershaw argues that Hitler was an unremarkable person, but his importance came from how people viewed him, an example of Max Weber's concept of charismatic leadership.

== See also ==
- Cult of personality
- Elite theory
- Folk hero
- Heroic theory of invention and scientific development
- Knight of faith
- Nouvelle histoire
- Paradigm shift
- People's history
- Philosophy of history
- Polymath
- Prosopography
- Protagonist
- Revolutionary
- Structure and agency
- Timeline of scientific discoveries
- Übermensch
- Whig history

== Bibliography ==
- Bentley, Eric (1944). A Century of Hero-Worship: A study of the idea of heroism in Carlyle and Nietzsche, with notes on Wagner, Spengler, Stefan George, and D.H. Lawrence (Second, revised and reset ed.). Boston: Beacon Press (published 1957).
- Harrold, Charles Frederick (1934). "Carlyle and Heroes". Carlyle and German Thought, 1819–1834. New Haven: Yale University Press. pp. 180–196.
- Lehman, B. H. (1928). Carlyle's Theory of the Hero: Its Sources, Development, History, and Influence on Carlyle's Work. Durham, N.C.: Duke University Press. hdl:2027/mdp.39015008382213.
