= List of Edison patents =

Below is a list of Edison patents. Thomas Edison was an inventor who accumulated 2,332 patents worldwide for his inventions. 1,093 of Edison's patents were in the United States, but other patents were approved in countries around the globe.

== Introduction ==
Edison is credited for contributing to various inventions, including the phonograph, the kinetoscope, the dictaphone, the electric lamp (in particular the incandescent light bulb), and the autographic printer. He also greatly improved the telephone by inventing the carbon microphone. Most of these inventions were not completely original but improvements of earlier inventions. However, one of Edison's major innovations was the first industrial research and development lab, which was built in Menlo Park and West Orange.

Throughout the 20th century, Edison was the world's most prolific inventor. At the beginning of the century, he held 736 U.S. patents. His final count was 1,093 U.S. patents, including 1084 utility patents (patents for inventions) and 9 artistic design patents. It was not until June 17, 2003, that he was passed by Japanese inventor Shunpei Yamazaki. Yamazaki was subsequently passed by Australian inventor Kia Silverbrook on February 26, 2008.

== American patents ==
=== First hundred patents ===
The first hundred patents mainly deal with the telegraph system. John Kruesi was the shop manager beginning in 1872. Kruesi built models, instruments, and apparatus for Edison's work. John Ott worked with Edison throughout his career. Ott was Edison's main model and instrument maker. Charles Batchelor was a superintendent for Edison toward the end of this series of patents.

- patent number – name of patent (external links to patent images in TIFF format)

Electrographic Vote-Recorder

1. U.S. patent 0,090,646 – Electrographic Vote-Recorder : Edison's first patent. Permitted a "yes" or "no" vote via one of two switches. Washington congressmen were not interested in the device and the invention was unsuccessful. (1869)
2. U.S. patent 0,091,527 – Printing-Telegraphs
3. U.S. patent 0,096,567 – Printing-Telegraph Apparatus
4. U.S. patent 0,096,681 – Automatic Electrical for Telegraph Apparatus
5. U.S. patent 0,102,320 – Printing-Telegraph Apparatus
6. U.S. patent 0,103,035 – Electro-Motor Escapements
7. U.S. patent 0,103,924 – Printing-Telegraph Instruments
8. U.S. patent 0,111,112 – Governors for Electro-Motors
9. U.S. patent 0,113,033 – Printing-Telegraph Apparatus
10. U.S. patent 0,113,034 – Printing-Telegraph Apparatus
11. U.S. patent 0,114,656 – Telegraphic Transmitting Instruments
12. U.S. patent 0,114,657 – Relay Magnets
13. U.S. patent 0,114,658 – Electro-Magnets for Telegraph Instruments
14. U.S. patent 0,121,601 – Machinery for Perforating Paper for Telegraph Purposes
15. U.S. patent 0,123,005 – Telegraph Apparatus (1872)
16. U.S. patent 0,123,006 – Printing-Telegraphs
17. U.S. patent 0,123,984 – Telegraph Apparatus
18. U.S. patent 0,124,800 – Telegraphic Recording Instruments
19. U.S. patent 0,126,528 – Type-Wheels for Printing-Telegraphs
20. U.S. patent 0,126,529 – Type-Wheels for Printing-Telegraphs
21. U.S. patent 0,126,530 – Printing-Telegraphs
22. U.S. patent 0,126,531 – Printing-Telegraphs
23. U.S. patent 0,126,532 – Printing-Telegraphs
24. U.S. patent 0,126,533 – Printing-Telegraphs
25. U.S. patent 0,126,534 – Printing-Telegraphs
26. U.S. patent 0,126,535 – Printing-Telegraphs
27. U.S. patent 0,128,131 – Printing-Telegraphs
28. U.S. patent 0,128,604 – Printing-Telegraphs
29. U.S. patent 0,128,605 – Printing-Telegraphs
30. U.S. patent 0,128,606 – Printing-Telegraphs
31. U.S. patent 0,128,607 – Printing-Telegraphs
32. U.S. patent 0,128,608 – Printing-Telegraph Instruments
33. U.S. patent 0,130,795 – Electro-Magnets
34. U.S. patent 0,131,334 – Rheotomes or Circuit-Directors
35. U.S. patent 0,131,335 – Printing-Telegraphs
36. U.S. patent 0,131,336 – Printing-Telegraphs
37. U.S. patent 0,131,337 – Printing-Telegraphs
38. U.S. patent 0,131,338 – Printing-Telegraphs
39. U.S. patent 0,131,339 – Printing-Telegraphs
40. U.S. patent 0,131,340 – Printing-Telegraphs
41. U.S. patent 0,131,341 – Printing-Telegraph Instruments
42. U.S. patent 0,131,342 – Printing-Telegraph Instruments
43. U.S. patent 0,131,343 – Transmitters and Circuits for Printing-Telegraphs
44. U.S. patent 0,131,344 – Unison-Stops for Printing-Telegraphs
45. U.S. patent 0,132,455 – Paper for Chemical Telegraphs etc.
46. U.S. patent 0,132,456 – Apparatus for Perforating Paper for Telegraphic Use
47. U.S. patent 0,133,019 – Electrical Printing-Machines
48. U.S. patent 0,133,841 – Type-Writing Machines
49. U.S. patent 0,134,866 – Printing-Telegraph Instruments (1873)
50. U.S. patent 0,134,867 – Automatic Telegraph Instruments
51. U.S. patent 0,134,868 – Electro-Magnetic Adjusters
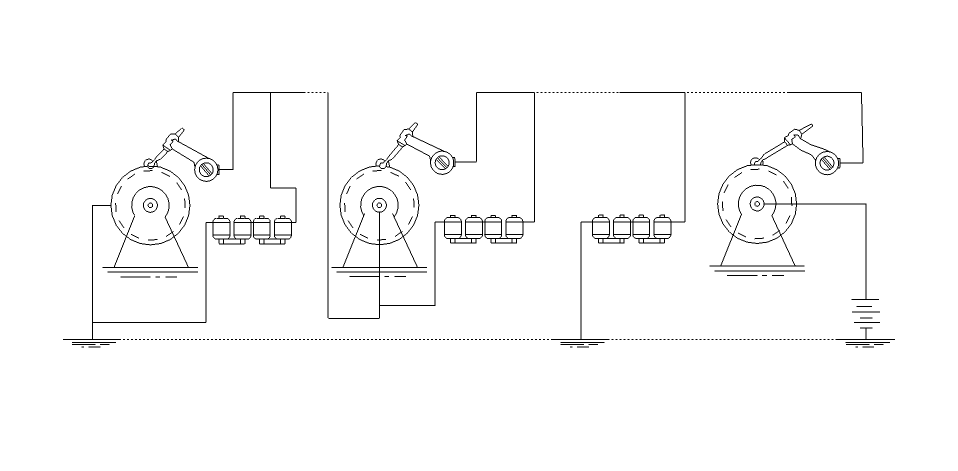
  Circuits for Chemical Telegraphs
52. U.S. patent 0,135,531 – Circuits for Chemical Telegraphs
53. U.S. patent 0,138,869 – Printing-Telegraphs
54. U.S. patent 0,138,870 – Printing-Telegraphs
55. U.S. patent 0,139,128 – Printing-Telegraphs
56. U.S. patent 0,139,129 – Printing-Telegraphs
57. U.S. patent 0,140,487 – Printing-Telegraphs
58. U.S. patent 0,140,488 – Printing-Telegraphs
59. U.S. patent 0,140,489 – Circuits for Printing-Telegraphs
60. U.S. patent 0,141,772 – Circuits for Automatic or Chemical Telegraphs
61. U.S. patent 0,141,773 – Circuits for Automatic Telegraphs
62. U.S. patent 0,141,774 – Chemical Telegraphs
63. U.S. patent 0,141,775 – Perforators for Automatic Telegraphs
64. U.S. patent 0,141,776 – Circuits for Automatic Telegraphs
65. U.S. patent 0,141,777 – Relay-Magnets
66. U.S. patent 0,142,688 – Electrical Regulators for Transmitting-Instruments
67. U.S. patent 0,142,999 – Galvanic Batteries
68. U.S. patent 0,146,812 – Telegraph-Signal Boxes
69. U.S. patent 0,147,311 – Electric Telegraphs
70. U.S. patent 0,147,312 – Perforators for Automatic Telegraphy
71. U.S. patent 0,147,313 – Chemical Telegraphs
72. U.S. patent 0,147,314 – Circuits for Chemical Telegraphs
73. U.S. patent 0,147,917 – Duplex Telegraphs
74. U.S. patent 0,150,846 – Telegraph-Relays
75. U.S. patent 0,150,847 – Receiving Instruments for Chemical Telegraphs
76. U.S. patent 0,150,848 – Chemical or Automatic Telegraphs
77. U.S. patent 0,151,209 – Automatic Telegraphy and Perforators Therefor
78. U.S. patent 0,154,788 – District Telegraph Signal-Boxes
79. U.S. patent 0,156,843 – Duplex Chemical Telegraphs
80. U.S. patent 0,158,787 – Telegraph Apparatus
81. U.S. patent 0,160,402 – Solutions for Chemical Telegraph-Paper
82. U.S. patent 0,160,403 – Solutions for Chemical Telegraph-Paper
83. U.S. patent 0,160,404 – Solutions for Chemical Telegraph-Paper
84. U.S. patent 0,160,405 – Adjustable Electro-Magnets for Relays, etc.
85. U.S. patent 0,160,580 – Solutions for Chemical Telegraph-Paper
86. U.S. patent 0,162,633 – Duplex Telegraphs
87. U.S. patent 0,166,859 – Chemical Telegraphy
88. U.S. patent 0,166,860 – Chemical Telegraphy
89. U.S. patent 0,166,861 – Chemical Telegraphy
90. U.S. patent 0,168,004 – Printing-Telegraphs
91. U.S. patent 0,168,242 – Transmitters and Receivers for Automatic Telegraphs
92. U.S. patent 0,168,243 – Automatic Telegraphs
93. U.S. patent 0,168,385 – Duplex Telegraphs
94. U.S. patent 0,168,465 – Solutions for Chemical Telegraphs
95. U.S. patent 0,168,466 – Solutions for Chemical Telegraphs
96. U.S. patent 0,168,467 – Recording-Points for Chemical Telegraphs
97. U.S. patent 0,169,972 – Electric-Signalling Instruments
98. U.S. patent 0,171,273 – Telegraph Apparatus
99. U.S. patent 0,172,305 – Automatic Roman-Character Telegraphs
100. U.S. patent 0,173,718 – Automatic Telegraphy

=== Second hundred (101 to 200) ===
In the second hundred patents, Edison continues his work with the telegraph. He also starts to patent electrical distribution and the light.

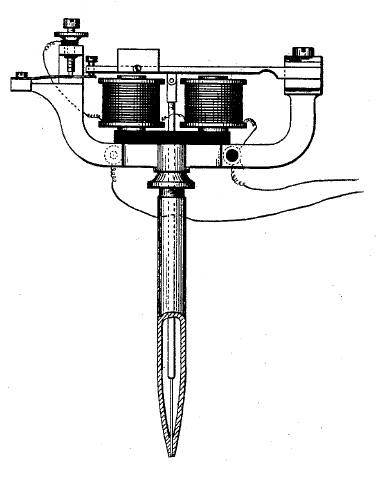
U.S. patent 196,747, Stencil-Pens. Later adapted to be a Tattoo machine.

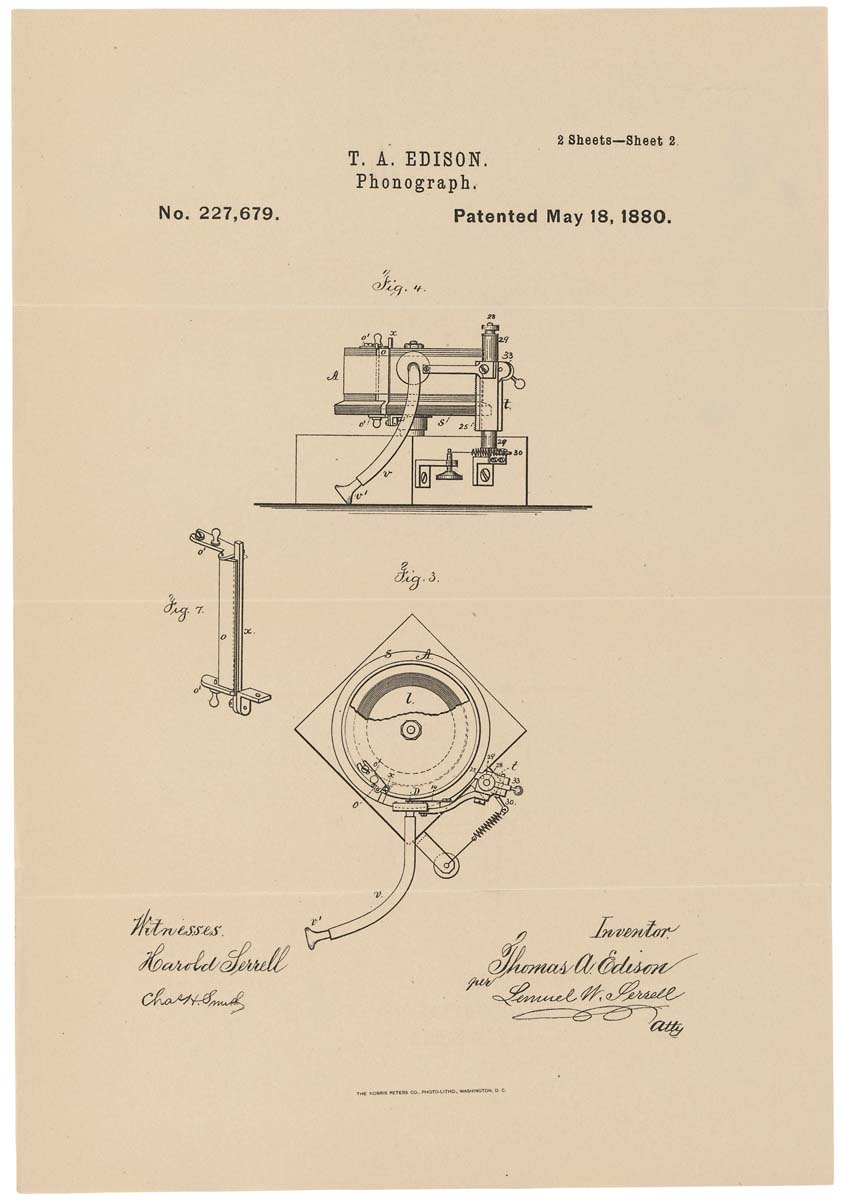
Patent drawing for Edison's phonograph, 18 May 1880.

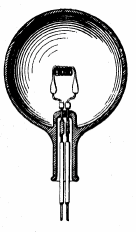
U.S. patent 223,898

1. U.S. patent 0,178,221 – Duplex Telegraphs (1876)
2. U.S. patent 0,178,222 – Duplex Telegraphs
3. U.S. patent 0,178,223 – Duplex Telegraphs
4. U.S. patent 0,180,857 – Autographic Printing
5. U.S. patent 0,180,858 – Duplex Telegraphs
6. U.S. patent 0,182,996 – Acoustic Telegraph
7. U.S. patent 0,185,507 – Electro-Harmonic Multiplex Telegraphs
8. U.S. patent 0,186,330 – Acoustic Electric Telegraphs
9. U.S. patent 0,186,548 – Telegraphic Alarm and Signal Apparatus
10. U.S. patent 0,195,751 – Automatic Telegraphs
11. U.S. patent 0,195,752 – Automatic Telegraphs
12. U.S. patent 0,196,747 – Stencil-Pens
13. U.S. patent 0,198,087 – Telephonic Telegraphs
14. U.S. patent 0,198,088 – Telephonic Telegraphs
15. U.S. patent 0,198,089 – Telephonic or Electro-Harmonic Telegraphs
16. U.S. patent 0,200,032 – Synchronous Movements for Electric Telegraphs
17. U.S. patent 0,200,521 – Phonograph or Speaking Machines : The first phonograph, a device for recording and replaying sound. Edison demonstrated the device for the first time on November 29, 1878. The device recorded on a phonograph cylinder using up-down (vertical) motion of the stylus. Edison's patent specified that the audio recording was embossed.
18. U.S. patent 0,200,993 – Acoustic Telegraphs
19. U.S. patent 0,200,994 – Automatic-Telegraph Perforator and Transmitter
20. U.S. patent 0,201,760 – Speaking-Machines
21. U.S. patent 0,203,013 – Speaking-Telegraphs
22. U.S. patent 0,203,014 – Speaking-Telegraphs
23. U.S. patent 0,203,015 – Speaking-Telegraphs
24. U.S. patent 0,203,016 – Speaking-Telephones
25. U.S. patent 0,203,017 – Telephone Call-Signal
26. U.S. patent 0,203,018 – Telephones or Speaking-Telegraphs
27. U.S. patent 0,203,019 – Circuits for Acoustic or Telephonic Telegraphs
28. U.S. patent 0,203,329 – Perforating Pens
29. U.S. patent 0,205,370 – Pneumatic Stencil-Pens
30. U.S. patent 0,207,723 – Duplex Telegraphs
31. U.S. patent 0,207,724 – Duplex Telegraphs
32. U.S. patent 0,208,299 – Speaking-Telephones
33. U.S. patent 0,209,241 – Quadruplex-Telegraph Repeaters
34. U.S. patent 0,210,767 – Vocal Engines (better known as the Phonomotor)
35. U.S. patent 0,213,554 – Automatic Telegraphs
36. U.S. patent 0,214,636 – Electric Lights
37. U.S. patent 0,214,637 – Thermal Regulators for Electric Lights
38. U.S. patent 0,217,781 – Sextuplex Telegraphs
39. U.S. patent 0,217,782 – Duplex Telegraphs
40. U.S. patent 0,218,166 – Magneto-Electric Machines
41. U.S. patent 0,218,167 – Apparatus for Electric Lights
42. U.S. patent 0,218,866 – Electric Lighting Apparatus
43. U.S. patent 0,219,393 – Dynamo-Electric Machine
44. U.S. patent 0,219,628 – Electric Lights
45. U.S. patent 0,221,957 – Telephones
46. U.S. patent 0,222,390 – Carbon-Telephones
47. U.S. patent 0,222,881 – Magneto-Electric Machines : Edison main dynamo. The device's nickname was the "long-legged Mary-Ann". This device has large bipolar magnets and is highly inefficient.
48. U.S. patent 0,223,898 – Electric Lamp : Edison's incandescent light bulb invention. The original spiral carbon-filament is shown and repeatedly referred to. First practical commercially viable electric lamp. This device replaced the flame lamp, gas lamp, kerosene-oil lamp, and wax candle.
49. U.S. patent 0,224,329 – Electric-Lighting Apparatus
50. U.S. patent 0,224,665 – Autographic Stencils for Printing
51. U.S. patent 0,227,226 – Safety-Conductor for Electric Lights
52. U.S. patent 0,227,227 – Electric Light
53. U.S. patent 0,227,228 – Electric Light
54. U.S. patent 0,227,229 – Electric Light
55. U.S. patent 0,227,679 – Phonograph
56. U.S. patent 0,228,329 – Magnetic Ore-Separator
57. U.S. patent 0,228,617 – Brake for Electro-Magnetic Motors
58. U.S. patent 0,230,255 – Method of Manufacturing Electric Lamps
59. U.S. patent 0,230,621 – Addressing-Machine
60. U.S. patent 0,231,704 – Electro-Chemical Receiving-Telephone
61. U.S. patent 0,235,142 – Acoustic Telegraph
62. U.S. patent 0,237,732 – Electric Light
63. U.S. patent 0,238,098 – Magneto Signal Apparatus
64. U.S. patent 0,238,868 – Manufacture of Carbons for Incandescent Electric Lamps
65. U.S. patent 0,239,147 – System of Electric Lighting
66. U.S. patent 0,239,148 – Treating Carbons for Electric Lamps
67. U.S. patent 0,239,149 – Incandescing Electric Lamp
68. U.S. patent 0,239,150 – Electric Lamp
69. U.S. patent 0,239,151 – Method of Forming Enlarged Ends on Carbon Filaments
70. U.S. patent 0,239,152 – System of Electric Lighting
71. U.S. patent 0,239,153 – Electric Lamp
72. U.S. patent 0,239,154 – Relay for Telegraphs
73. U.S. patent 0,239,372 – Testing Electric-Light Carbons
74. U.S. patent 0,239,373 – Electric Lamp
75. U.S. patent 0,239,374 – Regulating the Generation of Electric Currents
76. U.S. patent 0,239,745 – Electric Lamp
77. U.S. patent 0,240,678 – Webermeter
78. U.S. patent 0,242,896 – Incandescent Electric Lamp
79. U.S. patent 0,242,897 – Incandescent Electric Lamp
80. U.S. patent 0,242,898 – Magneto or Dynamo Electric Machine
81. U.S. patent 0,242,899 – Electric Lighting
82. U.S. patent 0,242,900 – Manufacturing Carbons for Electric Lamps
83. U.S. patent 0,242,901 – Electric Meter
84. U.S. patent 0,248,416 – Manufacture of Carbons for Electric Lamps
85. U.S. patent 0,248,417 – Manufacturing Carbons for Electric Lights
86. U.S. patent 0,248,418 – Electric Lamp
87. U.S. patent 0,248,419 – Electric Lamp
88. U.S. patent 0,248,420 – Fixture and Attachment for Electric Lamps
89. U.S. patent 0,248,421 – Current-Regulator for Dynamo-Electric Machines
90. U.S. patent 0,248,422 – System of Electric Lighting
91. U.S. patent 0,248,423 – Carbonizer
92. U.S. patent 0,248,424 – Fitting and Fixture for Electric Lamps
93. U.S. patent 0,248,425 – Apparatus for Producing High Vacuums
94. U.S. patent 0,248,426 – Apparatus for Treating Carbons for Electric Lamps
95. U.S. patent 0,248,427 – Apparatus for Treating Carbons for Electric Lamps
96. U.S. patent 0,248,428 – Manufacture of Incandescent Electric Lamps
97. U.S. patent 0,248,429 – Electric Motor
98. U.S. patent 0,248,430 – Electro-Magnetic Brake
99. U.S. patent 0,248,431 – Preserving Fruit
100. U.S. patent 0,248,432 – Magnetic Separator

=== 201 to 300 ===
The next series of patents Edison received was mainly for the electrical distribution of power and the electric light. In 1883, Edward H. Johnson, a business associate of Edison, persuaded Frank J. Sprague to work for Edison. One of Sprague's significant contributions to the Edison Laboratory was the introduction of mathematical methods.

1. U.S. patent 0,248,433 – Vacuum Apparatus (1881)
2. U.S. patent 0,248,434 – Governor for Electric Engines
3. U.S. patent 0,248,435 – Utilizing Electricity as a Motive Power
4. U.S. patent 0,248,436 – Depositing Cell for Plating the Connections of Electric Lamps, & c.
5. U.S. patent 0,248,437 – Apparatus for Treating Carbons for Electric Lamps
6. U.S. patent 0,248,565 – Webermeter
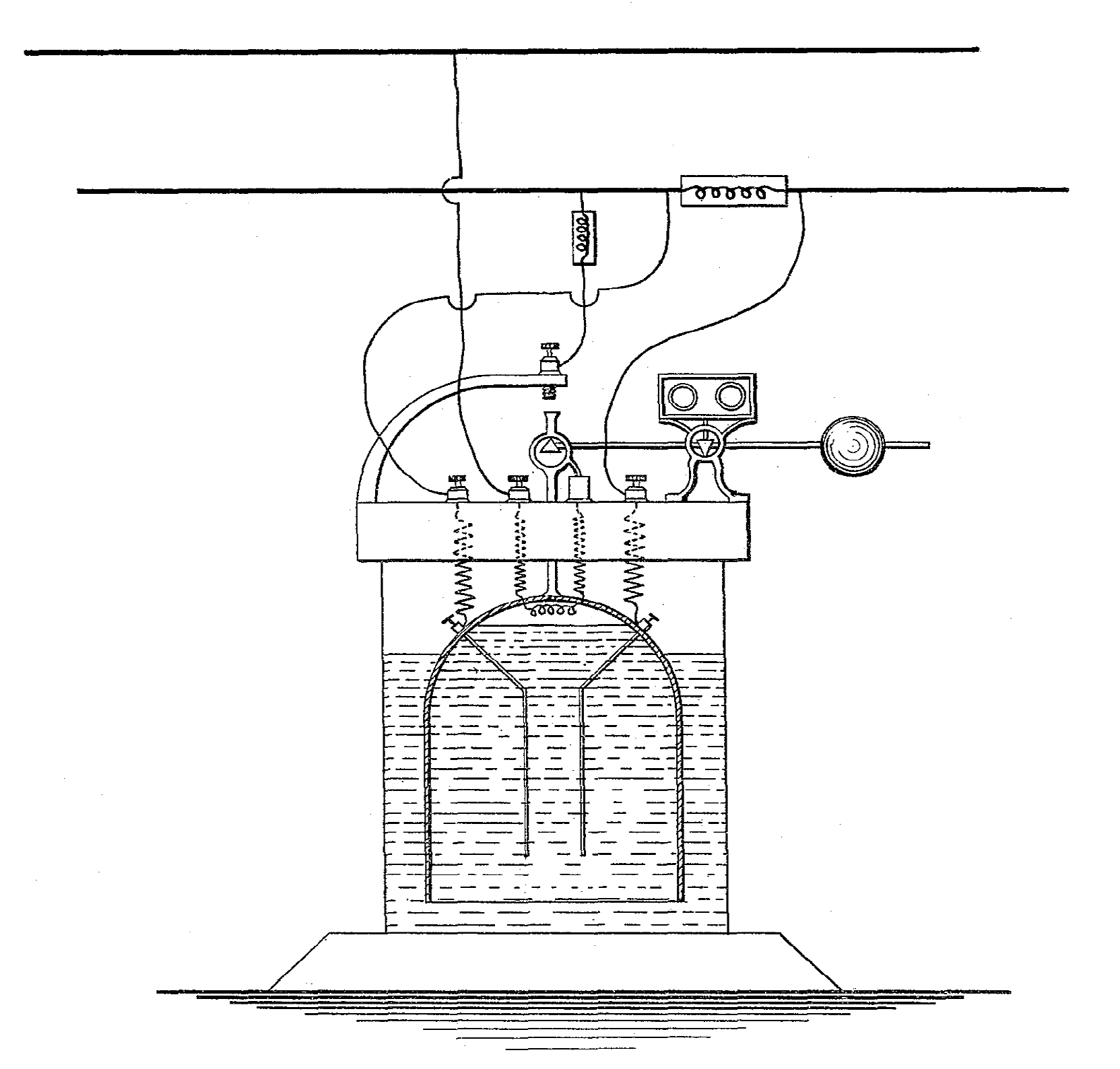
  US Patent 248565 Webermeter (Electrolysis of water / water splitting)
7. U.S. patent 0,251,536 – Vacuum-Pump
8. U.S. patent 0,251,537 – Dynamo-Electric Machine
9. U.S. patent 0,251,538 – Electric Light
10. U.S. patent 0,251,539 – Electric Lamp
11. U.S. patent 0,251,540 – Carbon for Electric Lamps
12. U.S. patent 0,251,541 – Electro-Magnetic Motor
13. U.S. patent 0,251,542 – System of Electric Lighting
14. U.S. patent 0,251,543 – Electric Lamp
15. U.S. patent 0,251,544 – Manufacture of Electric Lamps
16. U.S. patent 0,251,545 – Electric Meter
17. U.S. patent 0,251,546 – Electric Lamp
18. U.S. patent 0,251,547 – Electrical Governor
19. U.S. patent 0,251,548 – Incandescent Electric Lamp
20. U.S. patent 0,251,549 – Electric Lamp and the Manufacture Thereof
21. U.S. patent 0,251,550 – Magneto or Dynamo Electric Machine
22. U.S. patent 0,251,551 – System of Electric Lighting
23. U.S. patent 0,251,552 – Underground Conductors
24. U.S. patent 0,251,553 – Electric Chandelier
25. U.S. patent 0,251,554 – Electric Lamp and Socket or Holder
26. U.S. patent 0,251,555 – Regulator for Dynamo-Electric Machines
27. U.S. patent 0,251,556 – Regulator for Magneto or Dynamo Electric Machines
28. U.S. patent 0,251,557 – Webermeter
29. U.S. patent 0,251,558 – Webermeter
30. U.S. patent 0,251,559 – Electrical Drop-Light
31. U.S. patent 0,252,442 – Telephone
32. U.S. patent 0,257,677 – Telephone
33. U.S. patent 0,263,131 – Magnetic Ore-Separator
34. U.S. patent 0,263,132 – Electro-Magnetic Railway
35. U.S. patent 0,263,133 – Dynamo or Magneto Electric Machine
36. U.S. patent 0,263,134 – Regulator for Dynamo or Magneto Electric Machines
37. U.S. patent 0,263,135 – Electric Lamp
38. U.S. patent 0,263,136 – Regulator for Dynamo or Magneto Electric Machines
39. U.S. patent 0,263,137 – Electric Chandelier
40. U.S. patent 0,263,138 – Electric-Arc Light
41. U.S. patent 0,263,139 – Manufacture of Carbons for Electric Lamps
42. U.S. patent 0,263,140 – Dynamo-Electric Machine
43. U.S. patent 0,263,141 – Straightening Carbons of Electric Incandescent Lamps
44. U.S. patent 0,263,142 – Electrical Distribution System
45. U.S. patent 0,263,143 – Magneto or Dynamo Electric Machine
46. U.S. patent 0,263,144 – Mold for Carbonizing Incandescents
47. U.S. patent 0,263,145 – Process of Making Incandescents
48. U.S. patent 0,263,146 – Dynamo Magneto Electric Machine
49. U.S. patent 0,263,147 – Vacuum Apparatus
50. U.S. patent 0,263,148 – Dynamo or Magneto Electric Machine
51. U.S. patent 0,263,149 – Commutator for Dynamo or Magneto Electric Machines
52. U.S. patent 0,263,150 – Magneto or Dynamo Electric Machine
53. U.S. patent 0,263,878 – Electric Lamp
54. U.S. patent 0,264,642 – Electric Distribution and Translation System
55. U.S. patent 0,264,643 – Magneto-Electric Machine
56. U.S. patent 0,264,645 – System of Conductors for the Distribution of Electricity
57. U.S. patent 0,264,646 – Dynamo or Magneto Electric Machine
58. U.S. patent 0,264,647 – Dynamo or Magneto Electric Machine
59. U.S. patent 0,264,648 – Dynamo or Magneto Electric Machine
60. U.S. patent 0,264,649 – Dynamo or Magneto Electric Machine
61. U.S. patent 0,264,650 – Manufacture of Incandescing Electric Lamps
62. U.S. patent 0,264,651 – Incandescent Electric Lamp
63. U.S. patent 0,264,652 – Incandescent Electric Lamp
64. U.S. patent 0,264,653 – Incandescent Electric Lamp
65. U.S. patent 0,264,654 – Incandescent Electric Lamp
66. U.S. patent 0,264,655 – Incandescing Electric Lamp
67. U.S. patent 0,264,656 – Incandescent Electric Lamp
68. U.S. patent 0,264,657 – Incandescent Electric Lamp
69. U.S. patent 0,264,658 – Regulator for Dynamo-Electric Machines
70. U.S. patent 0,264,659 – Regulator for Dynamo-Electric Machines
71. U.S. patent 0,264,660 – Regulator for Dynamo-Electric Machines
72. U.S. patent 0,264,661 – Regulator for Dynamo-Electric Machines
73. U.S. patent 0,264,662 – Regulator for Dynamo-Electric Machines
74. U.S. patent 0,264,663 – Regulator for Dynamo-Electric Machines
75. U.S. patent 0,264,664 – Regulator for Dynamo-Electric Machines
76. U.S. patent 0,264,665 – Regulator for Dynamo-Electric Machines
77. U.S. patent 0,264,666 – Regulator for Dynamo-Electric Machines
78. U.S. patent 0,264,667 – Regulator for Dynamo-Electric Machines
79. U.S. patent 0,264,668 – Regulator for Dynamo-Electric Machines
80. U.S. patent 0,264,669 – Regulator for Dynamo-Electric Machines
81. U.S. patent 0,264,670 – Regulator for Dynamo-Electric Machines
82. U.S. patent 0,264,671 – Regulator for Dynamo-Electric Machines
83. U.S. patent 0,264,672 – Regulator for Dynamo-Electric Machines
84. U.S. patent 0,264,673 – Regulator for Dynamo-Electric Machines
85. U.S. patent 0,265,311 – Electric Lamp and Holder for the Same
86. U.S. patent 0,265,774 – Method of Maintaining Temperature in Webermeters
87. U.S. patent 0,265,775 – Electric-Arc Light
88. U.S. patent 0,265,776 – Electric-Lighting System
89. U.S. patent 0,265,777 – Method of Treating Carbons for Electric Lamps
90. U.S. patent 0,265,778 – Electro-Magnetic Railway-Engine
91. U.S. patent 0,265,779 – Regulator for Dynamo-Electric Machines
92. U.S. patent 0,265,780 – Regulator for Dynamo-Electric Machines
93. U.S. patent 0,265,781 – Regulator for Dynamo-Electric Machines
94. U.S. patent 0,265,782 – Regulator for Dynamo-Electric Machines
95. U.S. patent 0,265,783 – Regulator for Dynamo-Electric Machines
96. U.S. patent 0,265,784 – Regulator for Dynamo-Electric Machines
97. U.S. patent 0,265,785 – Dynamo-Electric Machine
98. U.S. patent 0,265,786 – Apparatus for the Electrical Transmission of Power
99. U.S. patent 0,266,021 – Telephone
100. U.S. patent 0,266,022 – Telephone

=== 301 to 400 ===
1. U.S. patent 0,266,447 – Electric Incandescent Lamp (1882)
2. U.S. patent 0,266,588 – Vacuum Apparatus
3. U.S. patent 0,266,793 – Electric Distribution System
4. U.S. patent 0,268,205 – Dynamo or Magneto Electric Machine
5. U.S. patent 0,268,206 – Incandescing Electric Lamp
6. U.S. patent 0,271,613 – Manufacture of Incandescing Electric Lamps
7. U.S. patent 0,271,614 – Shafting
8. U.S. patent 0,271,615 – Governor for Dynamo-Electric Machines
9. U.S. patent 0,271,616 – Regulator for Dynamo-Electric Machines
10. U.S. patent 0,272,034 – Telephone
11. U.S. patent 0,273,485 – Incandescing Electric Lamp
12. U.S. patent 0,273,486 – Incandescing Electric Lamp
13. U.S. patent 0,273,487 – Regulator for Dynamo-Electric Machines
14. U.S. patent 0,273,488 – Regulator for Dynamo-Electric Machines
15. U.S. patent 0,273,489 – Turn-Table for Electric Railways
16. U.S. patent 0,273,490 – Electro-Magnetic Railway System
17. U.S. patent 0,273,491 – Regulator for Driving Engines of Electrical Generators
18. U.S. patent 0,273,492 – Secondary Battery
19. U.S. patent 0,273,493 – Valve-Gear for Electrical Generator-Engines
20. U.S. patent 0,273,494 – Electrical Railroad
21. U.S. patent 0,273,714 – Magneto-Electric Signaling Apparatus
22. U.S. patent 0,273,715 – Art of Malleableizing Iron
23. U.S. patent 0,273,828 – System of Underground Conductors for Electrical Distribution
24. U.S. patent 0,274,290 – System of Electrical Distribution
25. U.S. patent 0,274,291 – Mold for Carbonizing
26. U.S. patent 0,274,292 – Secondary Battery
27. U.S. patent 0,274,293 – Electric Lamp
28. U.S. patent 0,274,294 – Incandescing Electric Lamp
29. U.S. patent 0,274,295 – Incandescent Electric Lamp
30. U.S. patent 0,274,296 – Manufacture of Incandescents
31. U.S. patent 0,274,576 – Transmitting-Telephone
32. U.S. patent 0,274,577 – Telephone
33. U.S. patent 0,275,612 – Manufacture of Incandescing Electric Lamps
34. U.S. patent 0,275,613 – Incandescing Electric Lamp
35. U.S. patent 0,276,232 – Means for Operating and Regulating Electrical Generators
36. U.S. patent 0,276,233 – Electrical Generator and Motor
37. U.S. patent 0,278,413 – Regulator for Dynamo-Electric Machines
38. U.S. patent 0,278,414 – Regulator for Dynamo-Electric Machines
39. U.S. patent 0,278,415 – Manufacture of Incandescing Electric Lamps
40. U.S. patent 0,278,416 – Manufacture of Incandescing Electric Lamps
41. U.S. patent 0,278,417 – Manufacture of Incandescing Electric Lamps
42. U.S. patent 0,278,418 – Apparatus for Translating Electric Currents From High to Low Tension
43. U.S. patent 0,278,419 – Dynamo-Electric Machine
44. U.S. patent 0,280,727 – System of Electrical Distribution
45. U.S. patent 0,281,349 – Regulator for Dynamo-Electric Machines
46. U.S. patent 0,281,350 – Regulator for Dynamo-Electric Machines
47. U.S. patent 0,281,351 – Electrical Generator
48. U.S. patent 0,281,352 – Webermeter
49. U.S. patent 0,281,353 – Dynamo or Magneto Electric Machine
50. U.S. patent 0,282,287 – Magneto-Electric Signaling Apparatus
51. U.S. patent 0,283,983 – System of Electrical Distribution
52. U.S. patent 0,283,984 – System of Electrical Distribution
53. U.S. patent 0,283,985 – System of Electrical Distribution
54. U.S. patent 0,283,986 – System of Electrical Distribution
55. U.S. patent 0,287,511 – Electric Regulator
56. U.S. patent 0,287,512 – Dynamo-Electric Machine
57. U.S. patent 0,287,513 – Dynamo-Electric Machine
58. U.S. patent 0,287,514 – Dynamo-Electric Machine
59. U.S. patent 0,287,515 – System of Electrical Distribution
60. U.S. patent 0,287,516 – System of Electrical Distribution
61. U.S. patent 0,287,517 – System of Electrical Distribution
62. U.S. patent 0,287,518 – Method of Manufacturing Incandescing Electric Lamps
63. U.S. patent 0,287,519 – Incandescing Electric Lamp
64. U.S. patent 0,287,520 – Incandescing Conductor for Electric Lamps
65. U.S. patent 0,287,521 – Dynamo or Magneto Electric Machine
66. U.S. patent 0,287,522 – Mold for Carbonizing
67. U.S. patent 0,287,523 – Dynamo or Magneto Electric Machine
68. U.S. patent 0,287,524 – Regulator for Dynamo-Electric Machines
69. U.S. patent 0,287,525 – Regulator for Systems of Electrical Distribution
70. U.S. patent 0,288,318 – Regulator for Dynamo or Magneto Electric Machines
71. U.S. patent 0,293,432 – Electrical Generator or Motor
72. U.S. patent 0,293,433 – Insulation of Railroad-Tracks Used for Electrical Circuits
73. U.S. patent 0,293,434 – Incandescent Electric Lamp
74. U.S. patent 0,293,435 – Electrical Meter
75. U.S. patent 0,295,990 – Type-Writer
76. U.S. patent 0,297,580 – Electric-Arc Light
77. U.S. patent 0,297,581 – Incandescent Electric Lamp
78. U.S. patent 0,297,582 – Dynamo-Electric Machine
79. U.S. patent 0,297,583 – Dynamo-Electric Machine
80. U.S. patent 0,297,584 – Dynamo-Electric Machine
81. U.S. patent 0,297,585 – Incandescing Conductor for Electric Lamps
82. U.S. patent 0,297,586 – Electrical Conductor
83. U.S. patent 0,297,587 – Dynamo-Electric Machine
84. U.S. patent 0,298,679 – Method of Treating Carbons for Electric Lights
85. U.S. patent 0,298,954 – Dynamo-Electric Machine
86. U.S. patent 0,298,955 – Dynamo-Electric Machine
87. U.S. patent 0,298,956 – Mode of Operating Dynamo-Electric Machines
88. U.S. patent 0,304,082 – Electrical Meter
89. U.S. patent 0,304,083 – Dynamo-Electric Machine
90. U.S. patent 0,304,084 – Device for Protecting Electric-Light Systems from Lightning
91. U.S. patent 0,304,085 – System of Electrical Distribution
92. U.S. patent 0,304,086 – Incandescent Electric Lamp
93. U.S. patent 0,304,087 – Electrical Conductor
94. U.S. patent 0,307,029 – Filament for Incandescent Lamps
95. U.S. patent 0,307,030 – Electrical Meter
96. U.S. patent 0,307,031 – Electrical Indicator
97. U.S. patent 0,314,115 – Chemical Stock Quotation Telegraph
98. U.S. patent 0,317,631 – Incandescent Electric Lamp
99. U.S. patent 0,317,632 – Incandescent Electric Lamp
100. U.S. patent 0,317,633 – Incandescent Electric Lamp

=== 401 to 500 ===
This period includes patents for electrical distribution circuits and methods as well as patents for the ore refining business Edison was embarking on. He also continued to patent improvements in telegraphy, phonography, and lighting. Arthur Edwin Kennelly contributed to a variety of Edison's endeavors undertaken to create a unique product or service from 1887 to 1893.

1. U.S. patent 0,328,572 – Commutator for Dynamo-Electric Machines (1885)
2. U.S. patent 0,328,573 – System of Electric Lighting
3. U.S. patent 0,328,574 – System of Electric Lighting
4. U.S. patent 0,328,575 – System of Electric Lighting
5. U.S. patent 0,329,030 – Telephone
6. U.S. patent 0,333,289 – Telegraphy
7. U.S. patent 0,333,290 – Duplex Telegraphy
8. U.S. patent 0,333,291 – Way-Station Quadruplex Telegraphy
9. U.S. patent 0,334,853 – Mold for Carbonizing
10. U.S. patent 0,337,254 – Telephone
11. U.S. patent 0,339,278 – Electric Railway
12. U.S. patent 0,339,279 – System of Electrical Distribution
13. U.S. patent 0,340,707 – Telephonic Repeater
14. U.S. patent 0,340,708 – Electrical Signaling Apparatus
15. U.S. patent 0,340,709 – Telephone-Circuit
16. U.S. patent 0,341,644 – Incandescent Electric Lamp
17. U.S. patent 0,341,839 – Incandescing Electric Lamp
18. U.S. patent 0,343,017 – System of Electrical Distribution
19. U.S. patent 0,347,097 – Electrical Signaling Apparatus
20. U.S. patent 0,348,114 – Electrode for Telephone-Transmitters
21. U.S. patent 0,350,234 – System of Railway Signaling
22. U.S. patent 0,350,235 – Railway-Telegraphy
23. U.S. patent 0,351,855 – Electric Lamp
24. U.S. patent 0,351,856 – Incandescent Electric Lamp
25. U.S. patent 0,353,783 – Incandescent Electric Lamp
26. U.S. patent 0,354,310 – Manufacture of Carbon Conductors
27. U.S. patent 0,358,599 – Incandescent Electric Lamp
28. U.S. patent 0,358,600 – Incandescing Electric Lamp
29. U.S. patent 0,365,465 – Valve-Gear
30. U.S. patent 0,365,509 – Filament for Incandescent Electric Lamps
31. U.S. patent 0,365,978 – System of Electrical Distribution
32. U.S. patent 0,369,280 – System of Electrical Distribution
33. U.S. patent 0,369,439 – System of Electrical Distribution
34. U.S. patent 0,369,441 – System of Electrical Distribution
35. U.S. patent 0,369,442 – System of Electrical Distribution
36. U.S. patent 0,369,443 – System of Electrical Distribution
37. U.S. patent 0,370,123 – Electric Meter
38. U.S. patent 0,370,124 – Manufacture of Filaments for Incandescing Electric Lights
39. U.S. patent 0,370,125 – Electrical Transmission of Power
40. U.S. patent 0,370,126 – Electrical Transmission of Power
41. U.S. patent 0,370,127 – Electrical Transmission of Power
42. U.S. patent 0,370,128 – Electrical Transmission of Power
43. U.S. patent 0,370,129 – Electrical Transmission of Power
44. U.S. patent 0,370,130 – Electrical Transmission of Power
45. U.S. patent 0,370,131 – Electrical Transmission of Power
46. U.S. patent 0,370,132 – Telegraphy
47. U.S. patent 0,373,584 – Dynamo-Electric Machine : Includes an extra coil and utilizes a field of force.
48. U.S. patent 0,377,374 – Telegraphy
49. U.S. patent 0,377,518 – Magnetic Separator
50. U.S. patent 0,378,044 – Telephone-Transmitter
51. U.S. patent 0,379,770 – Incandescent Electric Lamp
52. U.S. patent 0,379,771 – Regulator for Dynamo-Electric Machines
53. U.S. patent 0,379,772 – System of Electrical Distribution
54. U.S. patent 0,379,944 – Commutator for Dynamo-Electric Machines
55. U.S. patent 0,380,100 – Pyromagnetic Motor
56. U.S. patent 0,380,101 – System of Electrical Distribution
57. U.S. patent 0,380,102 – System of Electrical Distribution
58. U.S. patent 0,382,414 – Burnishing Attachment for Phonographs
59. U.S. patent 0,382,415 – System of Electrical Distribution
60. U.S. patent 0,382,416 – Feed and Return Mechanism for Phonographs
61. U.S. patent 0,382,417 – Process of Making Phonogram-Blanks
62. U.S. patent 0,382,418 – Phonogram-Blank
63. U.S. patent 0,382,419 – Process of Duplicating Phonograms
64. U.S. patent 0,382,462 – Phonogram-Blank
65. U.S. patent 0,384,830 – Railway Signaling
66. U.S. patent 0,385,173 – System of Electrical Distribution
67. U.S. patent 0,386,974 – Phonograph
68. U.S. patent 0,389,369 – Incandescing Electric Lamp
69. U.S. patent 0,390,462 – Process of Making Carbon Filaments
70. U.S. patent 0,391,595 – System of Electric Lighting
71. U.S. patent 0,391,596 – Incandescent Electric Lamp
72. U.S. patent 0,393,462 – Process of Making Phonogram-Blanks
73. U.S. patent 0,393,463 – Machine for Making Phonogram-Blanks
74. U.S. patent 0,393,464 – Machine for Making Phonogram-Blanks
75. U.S. patent 0,393,465 – Method of Preparing Phonograph Recording-Surfaces
76. U.S. patent 0,393,466 – Phonograph-Recorder
77. U.S. patent 0,393,966 – Method of Recording and Reproducing Sounds
78. U.S. patent 0,393,967 – Method of Recording and Reproducing Sounds
79. U.S. patent 0,393,968 – Phonograph-Recorder
80. U.S. patent 0,394,105 – Phonograph-Recorder
81. U.S. patent 0,394,106 – Phonograph-Reproducer
82. U.S. patent 0,395,123 – Circuit-Controller for Dynamo-Electric Machines
83. U.S. patent 0,395,962 – Method of Manufacturing Electric Lamps
84. U.S. patent 0,395,963 – Incandescent-Lamp Filament
85. U.S. patent 0,396,356 – Magnetic Separator
86. U.S. patent 0,397,280 – Phonograph Recorder and Reproducer
87. U.S. patent 0,397,705 – Method of Winding Field-Magnets
88. U.S. patent 0,397,706 – Phonograph
89. U.S. patent 0,398,774 – Incandescent Electric Lamp
90. U.S. patent 0,400,317 – Ore-Separator
91. U.S. patent 0,400,646 – Phonograph Recorder and Reproducer
92. U.S. patent 0,400,647 – Phonograph
93. U.S. patent 0,400,648 – Phonogram-Blank
94. U.S. patent 0,400,649 – Method of Making Phonogram-Blanks
95. U.S. patent 0,400,650 – Method of Making Phonogram-Blanks
96. U.S. patent 0,401,486 – System of Electric Lighting
97. U.S. patent 0,401,646 – Incandescing Electric Lamp
98. U.S. patent 0,404,902 – Electrical-Distribution System
99. U.S. patent 0,406,130 – Manufacture of Incandescent Electric Lamps
100. U.S. patent 0,406,567 – Telephone

=== 501 to 600 ===
This series of patents mainly focus on the phonograph, telegraphy, telephone, and electrical generation and distribution.

1. U.S. patent 0,406,568 – Phonograph (1889)
2. U.S. patent 0,406,569 – Phonogram-Blank
3. U.S. patent 0,406,570 – Phonograph
4. U.S. patent 0,406,571 – Process of Treating Phonogram-Blanks
5. U.S. patent 0,406,572 – Automatic Determining Device for Phonographs
6. U.S. patent 0,406,573 – Automatic Determining Device for Phonographs
7. U.S. patent 0,406,574 – Automatic Determining Device for Phonographs
8. U.S. patent 0,406,575 – Automatic Determining Device for Phonographs
9. U.S. patent 0,406,576 – Phonogram-Blank
10. U.S. patent 0,406,824 – Electric Meter
11. U.S. patent 0,406,825 – Electric Meter
12. U.S. patent 0,411,016 – Manufacture of Carbon Filaments
13. U.S. patent 0,411,017 – Carbonizing-Flask
14. U.S. patent 0,411,018 – Manufacture of Incandescent Electric Lamps
15. U.S. patent 0,411,019 – Manufacture of Incandescent Electric Lamps
16. U.S. patent 0,411,020 – Manufacture of Carbon Filaments
17. U.S. patent 0,414,759 – Phonogram-Blank
18. U.S. patent 0,414,760 – Phonograph
19. U.S. patent 0,414,761 – Phonogram-Blank
20. U.S. patent 0,420,594 – Quadruplex Telegraph
21. U.S. patent 0,422,072 – Telegraphy
22. U.S. patent 0,422,073 – Telegraphy
23. U.S. patent 0,422,074 – Telegraphy
24. U.S. patent 0,422,577 – Apparatus for Speaking-Telephones
25. U.S. patent 0,422,578 – Telephonic Repeater
26. U.S. patent 0,422,579 – Telephonic Repeater
27. U.S. patent 0,423,039 – Phonograph for Dolls or other Toys
28. U.S. patent 0,425,760 – Measurement of Electricity in Distribution Systems
29. U.S. patent 0,425,761 – Incandescent Lamp
30. U.S. patent 0,425,762 – Cut-Out for Incandescent Electric Lamps
31. U.S. patent 0,425,763 – Commutator for Dynamo-Electric Machines
32. U.S. patent 0,426,527 – Automatic Determining Device for Phonographs
33. U.S. patent 0,430,274 – Phonogram-Blank
34. U.S. patent 0,430,275 – Magnetic Separator
35. U.S. patent 0,430,276 – Phonograph
36. U.S. patent 0,430,277 – Automatic Determining Device for Phonographs
37. U.S. patent 0,430,278 – Phonograph
38. U.S. patent 0,430,279 – Voltaic Battery
39. U.S. patent 0,430,280 – Magnetic Separator
40. U.S. patent 0,430,570 – Phonogram-Blank
41. U.S. patent 0,430,932 – Manufacture of Incandescent Lamps
42. U.S. patent 0,430,933 – Filament for Incandescent Lamps
43. U.S. patent 0,430,934 – Electric-Lighting System
44. U.S. patent 0,431,018 – Dynamo or Magneto-Electric Machine
45. U.S. patent 0,434,585 – Telegraph-Relay
46. U.S. patent 0,434,586 – Electric Generator
47. U.S. patent 0,434,587 – Thermo-Electric Battery
48. U.S. patent 0,434,588 – Magnetic Ore-Separator
49. U.S. patent 0,434,589 – Propelling Mechanism for Electric Vehicles
50. U.S. patent 0,435,687 – Means for Charging and Using Secondary Batteries
51. U.S. patent 0,435,688 – Process of and Apparatus for Generating Electricity
52. U.S. patent 0,435,689 – Telegraphy
53. U.S. patent 0,435,690 – Method of Making Armatures for Dynamo-Electric Machines
54. U.S. patent 0,436,127 – Electric Motor
55. U.S. patent 0,436,968 – Method of and Apparatus for Drawing Wire
56. U.S. patent 0,436,969 – Method of and Apparatus for Drawing Wire
57. U.S. patent 0,436,970 – Apparatus for Transmitting Power
58. U.S. patent 0,437,422 – Telegraphy
59. U.S. patent 0,437,423 – Phonograph
60. U.S. patent 0,437,424 – Phonograph
61. U.S. patent 0,437,425 – Phonograph-Recorder
62. U.S. patent 0,437,426 – Phonograph
63. U.S. patent 0,437,427 – Method of Making Phonogram-Blanks
64. U.S. patent 0,437,428 – Propelling Device for Electric Cars
65. U.S. patent 0,437,429 – Phonogram-Blank
66. U.S. patent 0,438,298 – Manufacture of Incandescent Electric Lamps
67. U.S. patent 0,438,299 – Manufacture of Carbon Filaments
68. U.S. patent 0,438,300 – Gage for Testing Fibers for Incandescent-Lamp Carbons
69. U.S. patent 0,438,301 – System of Electric Lighting
70. U.S. patent 0,438,302 – Commutator for Dynamo-Electric Machines
71. U.S. patent 0,438,303 – Arc Lamp
72. U.S. patent 0,438,304 – Electric Signaling Apparatus
73. U.S. patent 0,438,305 – Fuse-Block
74. U.S. patent 0,438,306 – Telephone
75. U.S. patent 0,438,307 – Manufacture of Incandescent Electric Lamps
76. U.S. patent 0,438,308 – System of Electrical Distribution
77. U.S. patent 0,438,309 – Method of Insulating Electrical Conductors
78. U.S. patent 0,438,310 – Lamp-Base
79. U.S. patent 0,439,389 – Electric-Lighting System
80. U.S. patent 0,439,390 – System of Electric Lighting
81. U.S. patent 0,439,391 – Junction-Box for Electric Wires
82. U.S. patent 0,439,392 – Electric-Lighting System
83. U.S. patent 0,439,393 – Carbonizing-Chamber
84. U.S. patent 0,443,507 – Phonograph
85. U.S. patent 0,444,530 – Leading-In Wire for Incandescent Lamps
86. U.S. patent 0,446,666 – System of Electric Lighting
87. U.S. patent 0,446,667 – Locomotive for Electric Railways
88. U.S. patent 0,446,668 – Electric-Arc Light
89. U.S. patent 0,446,669 – Manufacture of Filaments for Incandescent Electric Lamps
90. U.S. patent 0,448,778 – Electric Railway
91. U.S. patent 0,448,779 – Telegraph
92. U.S. patent 0,448,780 – Device for Turning Off Phonogram-Blanks
93. U.S. patent 0,448,781 – Turning-Off Device for Phonographs
94. U.S. patent 0,450,740 – Phonograph-Recorder
95. U.S. patent 0,452,913 – Sextuplex Telegraph
96. U.S. patent 0,453,601 – Sextuplex Telegraph
97. U.S. patent 0,453,741 – Phonograph
98. U.S. patent 0,454,262 – Incandescent-Lamp Filament
99. U.S. patent 0,454,558 – Incandescent Electric Lamp
100. U.S. patent 0,454,941 – Phonograph Recorder or Reproducer

=== 601 to 700 ===
This series of patents contain patents for the phonograph, lamps, telephone, dynamo systems, motors, and locomotives.

1. U.S. patent 0,454,942 – Phonograph (1891)
2. U.S. patent 0,456,301 – Phonograph-Doll
3. U.S. patent 0,456,302 – Phonograph
4. U.S. patent 0,457,343 – Magnetic Belting
5. U.S. patent 0,457,344 – Smoothing-Tool for Phonogram-Blanks
6. U.S. patent 0,459,835 – Manufacture of Incandescent Electric Lamps
7. U.S. patent 0,460,122 – Process of and Apparatus for Generating Electricity
8. U.S. patent 0,460,123 – Phonogram-Blank Carrier
9. U.S. patent 0,462,540 – Incandescent Electric Lamp
10. U.S. patent 0,464,822 – System of Distributing Electricity
11. U.S. patent 0,465,250 – Process of Extracting Copper Pyrites
12. U.S. patent 0,465,251 – Method of Bricking Fine Ores
13. U.S. patent 0,465,970 – Armature Connection for Motors or Generators
14. U.S. patent 0,465,971 – Means for Transmitting Signals Electrically
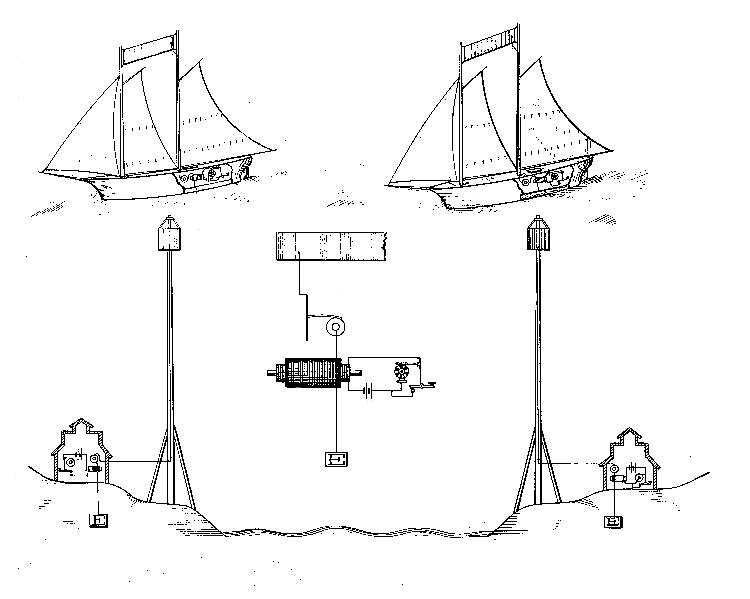
  Patent 465,971, Means for Transmitting Signals Electrically
15. U.S. patent 0,465,972 – Phonograph
16. U.S. patent 0,465,973 – Armature for Dynamos or Motors
17. U.S. patent 0,466,400 – Cut-Out for Incandescent Lamps
18. U.S. patent 0,466,460 – Art of Electrolytic Decomposition
19. U.S. patent 0,468,949 – Converter System for Electric Railways
20. U.S. patent 0,468,950 – Commutator-Brush for Electric Motors and Dynamos
21. U.S. patent 0,470,922 – Manufacture of Filaments for Incandescent Lamps
22. U.S. patent 0,470,923 – Railway-Signaling
23. U.S. patent 0,470,924 – Electric Conductor
24. U.S. patent 0,470,925 – Manufacture of Filaments for Incandescent Lamps
25. U.S. patent 0,470,926 – Dynamo-Electric Machine or Motor
26. U.S. patent 0,470,927 – Driving Mechanism for Cars
27. U.S. patent 0,470,928 – Alternating-Current Generator
28. U.S. patent 0,470,929 – Magnetic Separator
29. U.S. patent 0,470,930 – Dynamo-Electric Machine
30. U.S. patent 0,471,268 – Ore-Conveyor and Method of Arranging Ore Thereon
31. U.S. patent 0,472,288 – Dust-Proof Bearing for Shafts
32. U.S. patent 0,472,752 – Dust-Proof Journal-Bearing
33. U.S. patent 0,472,753 – Ore-Screening Apparatus
34. U.S. patent 0,474,230 – Speaking-Telegraph
35. U.S. patent 0,474,231 – Speaking-Telegraph
36. U.S. patent 0,474,232 – Speaking-Telegraph
37. U.S. patent 0,474,591 – Process of Extracting Gold from Sulphide Ores
38. U.S. patent 0,474,592 – Ore-Conveying Apparatus
39. U.S. patent 0,474,593 – Dust-Proof Swivel Shaft-Bearing
40. U.S. patent 0,475,491 – Electric Locomotive
41. U.S. patent 0,475,492 – Electric Locomotive
42. U.S. patent 0,475,493 – Electric Locomotive
43. U.S. patent 0,475,494 – Electric Railway
44. U.S. patent 0,476,527 – System of Electric Lighting
45. U.S. patent 0,476,528 – Incandescent Electric Lamp
46. U.S. patent 0,476,529 – System of Electrical Distribution
47. U.S. patent 0,476,530 – Incandescent Electric Lamp
48. U.S. patent 0,476,531 – Electric-Lighting System
49. U.S. patent 0,476,532 – Ore-Screening Apparatus
50. U.S. patent 0,476,983 – Pyromagnetic Generator
51. U.S. patent 0,476,984 – Expansible Pulley
52. U.S. patent 0,476,985 – Trolley for Electric Railways
53. U.S. patent 0,476,986 – Means for Propelling Electric Cars
54. U.S. patent 0,476,987 – Electric Locomotive
55. U.S. patent 0,476,988 – Lightning-Arrester
56. U.S. patent 0,476,989 – Conductor for Electric Railways
57. U.S. patent 0,476,990 – Electric Meter
58. U.S. patent 0,476,991 – Method of and Apparatus for Separating Ores
59. U.S. patent 0,476,992 – Incandescent Electric Lamp
60. U.S. patent 0,476,993 – Electric-Arc Lamp
61. U.S. patent 0,478,743 – Telephone-Repeater
62. U.S. patent 0,479,184 – Fac-simile Telegraph
63. U.S. patent 0,480,567 – Duplex Telegraph
64. U.S. patent 0,482,549 – Means for Controlling Electric Generation
65. U.S. patent 0,484,183 – Electrical Depositing-Meter
66. U.S. patent 0,484,184 – Manufacture of Carbon Filaments
67. U.S. patent 0,484,185 – Manufacture of Carbon Filaments
68. U.S. patent 0,484,582 – Duplicating Phonograms
69. U.S. patent 0,484,583 – Phonograph Cutting-Tool
70. U.S. patent 0,484,584 – Phonograph-Reproducer
71. U.S. patent 0,484,585 – Phonograph
72. U.S. patent 0,485,615 – Manufacture of Carbon Filaments
73. U.S. patent 0,485,616 – Manufacture of Carbon Filaments
74. U.S. patent 0,485,617 – Incandescent-Lamp Filament
75. U.S. patent 0,485,840 – Method of Bricking Fine Iron Ores
76. U.S. patent 0,485,841 – Method of Magnetically Separating Ores
77. U.S. patent 0,485,842 – Method of Magnetic-Ore Separation
78. U.S. patent 0,486,634 – System of Railway Signaling
79. U.S. patent 0,488,189 – Phonograph
80. U.S. patent 0,488,190 – Phonograph-Reproducer
81. U.S. patent 0,488,191 – Phonogram-Blank
82. U.S. patent 0,490,953 – Art of Generating Electricity
83. U.S. patent 0,490,954 – Manufacture of Carbon Filaments for Electric Lamps
84. U.S. patent 0,491,992 – Cut-Out for Incandescent Electric Lamps
85. U.S. patent 0,491,993 – Stop Device
86. U.S. patent 0,492,150 – Process of Coating Conductors for Incandescent Lamps
87. U.S. patent 0,492,789 – Speaking-Telegraph
88. U.S. patent 0,493,425 – Electric Locomotive
89. U.S. patent 0,493,426 – Apparatus for Exhibiting Photographs of Moving Objects
90. U.S. patent 0,493,858 – Transmission of Power
91. U.S. patent 0,496,191 – Phonograph
92. U.S. patent 0,498,385 – Roller for Crushing Ore or Other Material
93. U.S. patent 0,499,879 – Phonograph
94. U.S. patent 0,500,280 – Phonograph
95. U.S. patent 0,500,281 – Phonograph
96. U.S. patent 0,500,282 – Phonograph
97. U.S. patent 0,506,215 – Method of Making Plate Glass
98. U.S. patent 0,506,216 – Apparatus for Making Glass
99. U.S. patent 0,509,428 – Composition Brick and Method of Making Same
100. U.S. patent 0,509,517 – System of Electrical Distribution

=== 701 to 800 ===
Around these patents issuances, Thomas Armat joined Edison and sold him the patents to the machine known as the Vitascope.

1. U.S. patent 0,509,518 – Electric Railway (1893)
2. U.S. patent 0,512,872 – Sextuplex Telegraph
3. U.S. patent 0,513,096 – Method of and Apparatus for Mixing Materials
4. U.S. patent 0,513,097 – Phonograph
5. U.S. patent 0,513,095 – Phonograph
6. U.S. patent 0,524,136 – Regulator for Dynamo-Electric Machines
7. U.S. patent 0,524,378 – System of Electrical Distribution
8. U.S. patent 0,525,007 – Manufacture of Carbon Filaments
9. U.S. patent 0,525,888 – Manufacture of Carbons for Electric Lamps
10. U.S. patent 0,526,147 – Art of Plating One Material with Another
11. U.S. patent 0,534,206 – Filament for Incandescent Lamps
12. U.S. patent 0,534,207 – Manufacture of Carbon Filaments
13. U.S. patent 0,534,208 – Induction-Converter
14. U.S. patent 0,534,209 – Incandescent Electric Lamp
15. U.S. patent 0,541,923 – Phonograph
16. U.S. patent 0,541,924 – Phonograph
17. U.S. patent 0,543,985 – Incandescent Conductor for Electric Lamps
18. U.S. patent 0,543,986 – Process of Treating and Products Derived from Vegetable Fibers
19. U.S. patent 0,543,987 – Filament for Incandescent Lamps
20. U.S. patent 0,545,405 – System of Electrical Distribution
21. U.S. patent 0,563,462 – Method of and Apparatus for Drawing Wire
22. U.S. patent 0,564,423 – Process of Separating Ores
23. U.S. patent 0,567,187 – Crushing-Roll
24. U.S. patent 0,575,151 – Phonograph
25. U.S. patent 0,589,168 – Kinetographic Camera
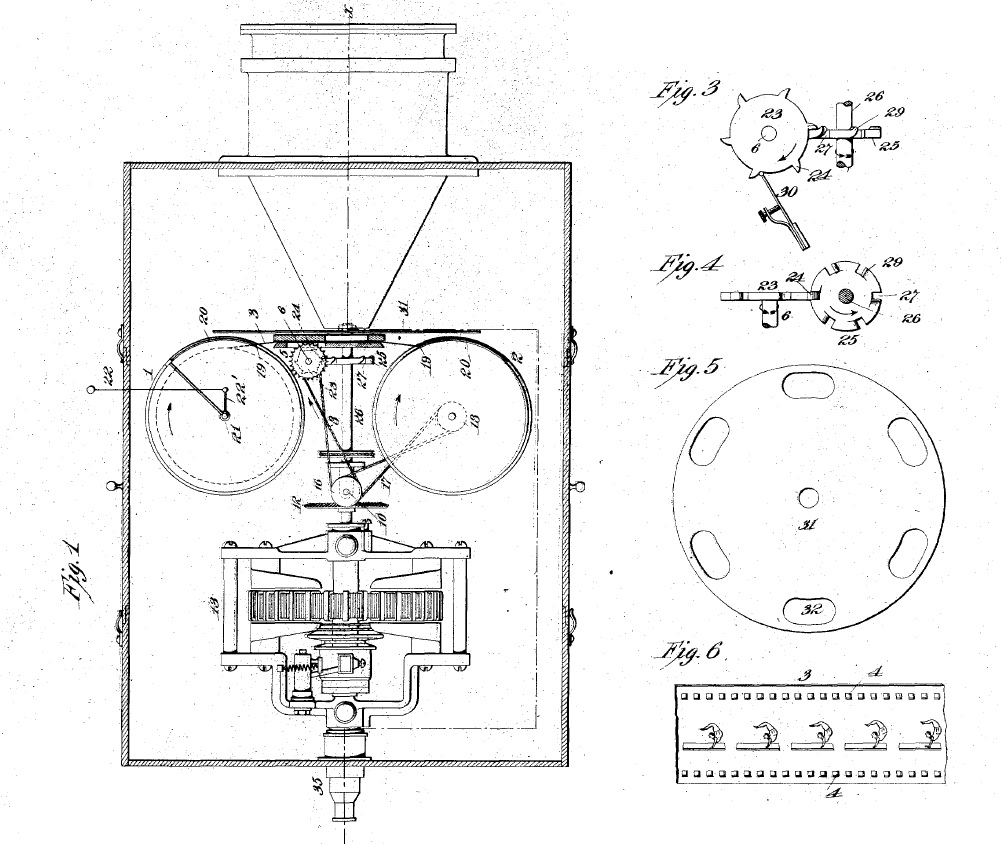
  U.S. patent 0,589,168, Kinetographic Camera of Edison Company.
26. U.S. patent 0,602,064 – Conveyor
27. U.S. patent 0,604,740 – Governor for Motors
28. U.S. patent 0,605,475 – Drying Apparatus
29. U.S. patent 0,605,667 – Phonograph
30. U.S. patent 0,605,668 – Mixer
31. U.S. patent 0,607,588 – Phonograph
32. U.S. patent 0,609,268 – Phonograph
33. U.S. patent 0,610,706 – Phonograph
34. U.S. patent 0,622,843 – Phonograph
35. U.S. patent 0,626,460 – Filament for Incandescent Lamps and Process of Manufacturing Same
36. U.S. patent 0,637,327 – Rolls
37. U.S. patent 0,641,281 – Expanding Pulley
38. U.S. patent 0,643,764 – Method of Reheating Compressed Air for Industrial Purposes
39. U.S. patent 0,648,933 – Drier
40. U.S. patent 0,648,934 – Process of Screening or Sizing Very Fine Materials
41. U.S. patent 0,648,935 – Apparatus for Duplicating Phonograph-Records
42. U.S. patent 0,652,457 – Phonograph
43. U.S. patent 0,655,480 – Phonographic Reproducing Device
44. U.S. patent 0,657,527 – Process of Making Metallic Duplicate Phonograph-Records
45. U.S. patent 0,657,922 – Apparatus for Reheating Compressed Air for Industrial Purposes
46. U.S. patent 0,659,389 – Electric Meter
47. U.S. patent 0,660,293 – Electric Meter
48. U.S. patent 0,660,845 – Apparatus for Sampling, Averaging, Mixing, and Storing Materials in Bulk
49. U.S. patent 0,661,238 – Machine for Forming Pulverized Material into Briquets
50. U.S. patent 0,662,063 – Process of Sampling, Averaging, Mixing, and Storing Materials in Bulk
51. U.S. patent 0,663,015 – Electric Meter
52. U.S. patent 0,667,201 – Flight Conveyor
53. U.S. patent 0,667,202 – Apparatus for Duplicating Phonograph-Records
54. U.S. patent 0,667,662 – Process of Duplicating Phonograph-Records
55. U.S. patent 0,671,314 – Lubricating Journal-Bearings
56. U.S. patent 0,671,315 – Conveyor
57. U.S. patent 0,671,316 – Apparatus for Screening or Rescreening Fine Materials
58. U.S. patent 0,671,317 – Method of Screening or Rescreening Fine Materials
59. U.S. patent 0,672,616 – Method of Breaking Rock
60. U.S. patent 0,672,617 – Apparatus for Breaking Rock
61. U.S. patent 0,674,057 – Grinding or Crushing Rolls
62. U.S. patent 0,675,056 – Magnetic Separator
63. U.S. patent 0,675,057 – Apparatus for Screening Pulverized Material
64. U.S. patent 0,676,225 – Phonographic Recording Apparatus
65. U.S. patent 0,676,618 – Magnetic Separator
66. U.S. patent 0,676,840 – Magnetic Separating Apparatus
67. U.S. patent 0,676,841 – Magnetic Separating Apparatus
68. U.S. patent 0,678,722 – Reversible Galvanic Battery
69. U.S. patent 0,679,500 – Apparatus for Screening or Sizing Very Fine Materials
70. U.S. patent 0,680,520 – Process of Making Duplicate Phonograph-Records
71. U.S. patent 0,684,204 – Reversible Galvanic Battery
72. U.S. patent 0,684,205 – Reversible Galvanic Battery
73. U.S. patent 0,685,911 – Apparatus for Reheating Compressed Air for Industrial Purposes
74. U.S. patent 0,688,610 – Phonograph Recording Apparatus
75. U.S. patent 0,692,507 – Reversible Galvanic Battery
76. U.S. patent 0,700,136 – Reversible Galvanic Battery
77. U.S. patent 0,700,137 – Reversible Galvanic Battery
78. U.S. patent 0,701,804 – Reversible Galvanic Battery
79. U.S. patent 0,703,051 – Electric Meter
80. U.S. patent 0,703,562 – Apparatus for Bricking Pulverized Material
81. U.S. patent 0,703,774 – Reproducer for Phonographs
82. U.S. patent 0,704,010 – Apparatus for Concentrating Magnetic Iron Ores
83. U.S. patent 0,704,303 – Reversible Galvanic Battery
84. U.S. patent 0,704,304 – Reversible Galvanic Battery
85. U.S. patent 0,704,305 – Electrode for Batteries
86. U.S. patent 0,704,306 – Reversible Galvanic Battery
87. U.S. patent 0,705,829 – Reproducer for Sound-Records
88. U.S. patent 0,713,209 – Process of Duplicating Phonograms
89. U.S. patent 0,713,863 – Process of Coating Phonograph-Records
90. U.S. patent 0,721,682 – Reversible Galvanic Battery
91. U.S. patent 0,721,870 – Funnel for Filling Storage-Battery Cans or Analogous Purposes
92. U.S. patent 0,722,502 – Means for Handling Cable-Drawn Cars on Inclines
93. U.S. patent 0,723,449 – Electrode for Storage Batteries
94. U.S. patent 0,723,450 – Reversible Galvanic Battery
95. U.S. patent 0,724,089 – Means for Operating Motors in Dust-Laden Atmospheres
96. U.S. patent 0,727,116 – Grinding-Rolls
97. U.S. patent 0,727,117 – Reversible Galvanic Battery
98. U.S. patent 0,727,118 – Process of Manufacturing Electrolytically-Active Finely-Divided Iron
99. U.S. patent 0,734,522 – Process of Nickel-Plating
100. U.S. patent 0,750,102 – Electrical Automobile

=== 801 to 900 ===
Toward the end of this series of patents, Ott was the superintendent of experimenters for Edison.

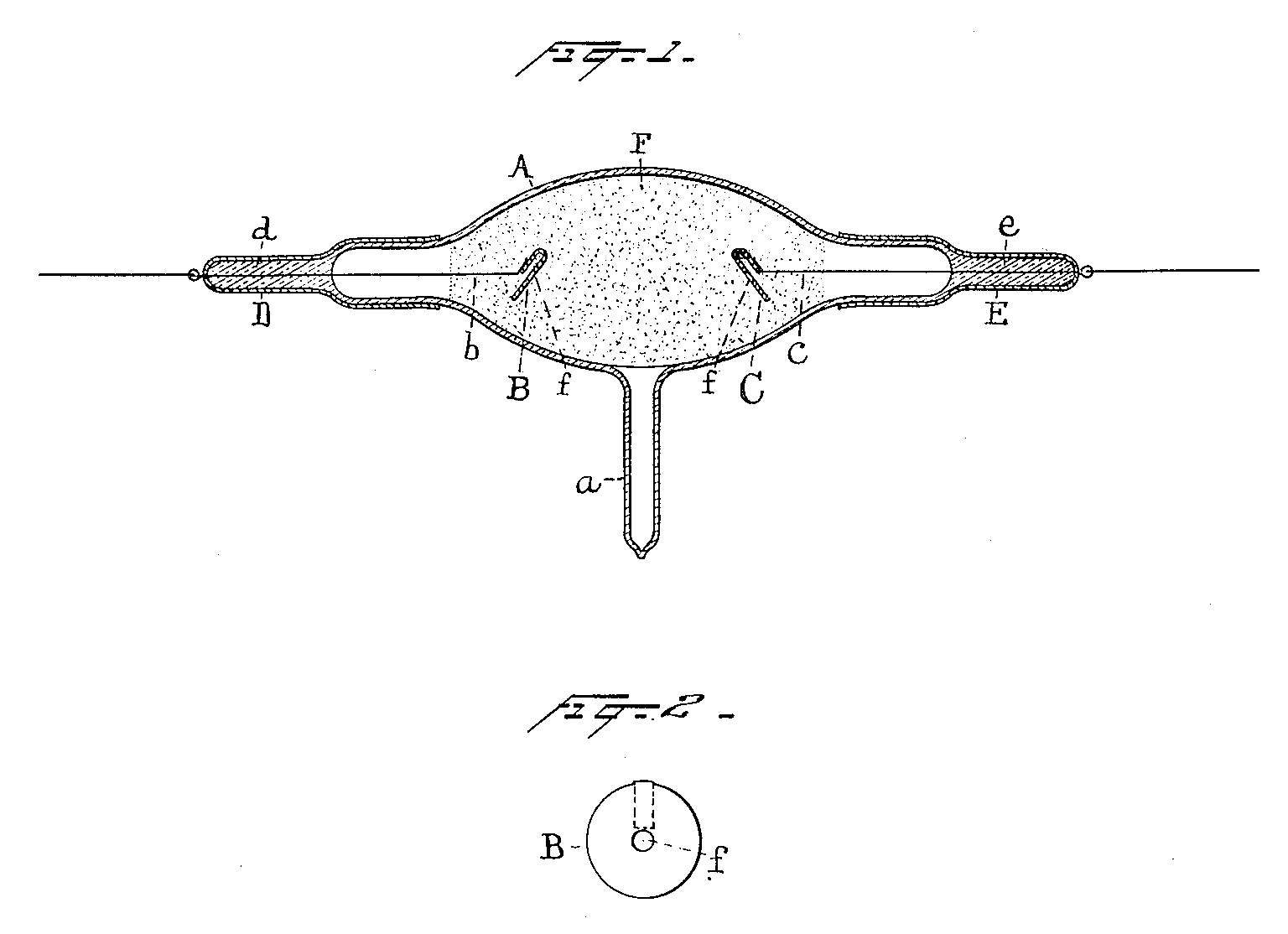
U.S. patent 0,865,367, Edison's fluorescent lamp worked using tungsten of calcium and strontium.

1. U.S. patent 0,754,755 – Compressing-Dies (1904)
2. U.S. patent 0,754,756 – Process of Separating Ores from Magnetic Gangue
3. U.S. patent 0,754,858 – Storage-Battery Tray
4. U.S. patent 0,754,859 – Reversible Galvanic Battery
5. U.S. patent 0,758,432 – Stock-House Conveyor
6. U.S. patent 0,759,356 – Method of Burning Portland-Cement Clinker, &c.
7. U.S. patent 0,759,357 – Apparatus for Burning Portland-Cement Clinker &c.
8. U.S. patent 0,759,358 – Magnetic Separating Apparatus
9. U.S. patent 0,764,183 – Method of Separating Mechanically-Entrained Globules from Gases
10. U.S. patent 0,766,815 – Primary Battery
11. U.S. patent 0,767,216 – Apparatus for Vacuously Depositing Metals
12. U.S. patent 0,767,554 – Method of Rendering Storage-Battery Gases Non-Explosive
13. U.S. patent 0,772,647 – Photographic Film for Moving-Picture Machines
14. U.S. patent 0,772,648 – Vehicle-Wheel
15. U.S. patent 0,775,600 – Rotary Cement-Kiln
16. U.S. patent 0,775,965 – Dry Separator
17. U.S. patent 0,785,297 – Gas-Separator for Storage Batteries
18. U.S. patent 0,790,351 – Process of Duplicating Phonographic Records
19. U.S. patent 0,796,629 – Lamp-Guard
20. U.S. patent 0,797,845 – Sheet Metal for Perforated Pockets of Storage Batteries
21. U.S. patent 0,800,800 – Phonograph-Record and Method of Making the Same
22. U.S. patent 0,802,631 – Apparatus for Burning Portland-Cement Clinker
23. U.S. patent 0,804,799 – Apparatus for Perforating Sheet Metal
24. U.S. patent 0,813,490 – Cement-Kiln
25. U.S. patent 0,813,491 – Pocket-Filling Machine
26. U.S. patent 0,817,162 – Process of Treating Alkaline
27. U.S. patent 0,821,032 – Storage Battery
28. U.S. patent 0,821,622 – Process of Cleaning Metallic Surfaces
29. U.S. patent 0,821,623 – Storage-Battery-Filling Apparatus
30. U.S. patent 0,821,624 – Gas-Separator for Storage Batteries
31. U.S. patent 0,821,625 – Process of Treating Alkaline Storage Batteries
32. U.S. patent 0,821,626 – Process of Making Metallic Films or Flakes
33. U.S. patent 0,821,627 – Process of Making Metallic Flakes or Scales
34. U.S. patent 0,821,628 – Process for Making Conducting-Films
35. U.S. patent 0,827,089 – Calcining-Furnace
36. U.S. patent 0,827,297 – Alkaline Battery
37. U.S. patent 0,827,717 – Process of Making Composite Metals
38. U.S. patent 0,831,269 – Storage-Battery Electrode-Plate
39. U.S. patent 0,831,606 – Sound-Recording Apparatus
40. U.S. patent 0,832,046 – Automatic Weighing and Mixing Apparatus
41. U.S. patent 0,839,371 – Method of Coating Active Material with Flake-Like Conducting Material
42. U.S. patent 0,839,372 – Phonograph Record or Blank
43. U.S. patent 0,841,677 – Apparatus for Grinding and Separating Fine Materials
44. U.S. patent 0,847,746 – Electrical Welding Apparatus
45. U.S. patent 0,850,881 – Composite Metal
46. U.S. patent 0,850,912 – Process of Making Articles by Electroplating
47. U.S. patent 0,850,913 – Secondary Battery
48. U.S. patent 0,852,424 – Secondary Battery
49. U.S. patent 0,854,200 – Process of Making Storage-Battery Electrodes
50. U.S. patent 0,855,562 – Diaphragm for Talking-Machines
51. U.S. patent 0,857,041 – Can or Receptacle for Storage Batteries
52. U.S. patent 0,857,929 – Storage-Battery Electrode
53. U.S. patent 0,858,862 – Primary and Secondary Battery
54. U.S. patent 0,860,195 – Storage-Battery Electrode
55. U.S. patent 0,861,241 – Portland Cement and Process of Manufacturing the Same
56. U.S. patent 0,861,242 – Can or Receptacle for Storage Batteries
57. U.S. patent 0,861,819 – Discharging Apparatus for Belt Conveyors
58. U.S. patent 0,862,145 – Process of Making Seamless Tubular Pockets or Receptacles for Storage Battery Electrodes
59. U.S. patent 0,865,367 – Fluorescent Electric Lamp
60. U.S. patent 0,865,687 – Process of Making Nickel Films
61. U.S. patent 0,865,688 – Process of Making Metallic Films or Flakes
62. U.S. patent 0,870,024 – Apparatus for Producing Perforated Strips
63. U.S. patent 0,871,214 – Reversible Galvanic Battery
64. U.S. patent 0,873,219 – Feed-Regulator for Grinding-Machines
65. U.S. patent 0,873,220 – Reversible Galvanic Battery
66. U.S. patent 0,876,445 – Electrolyte for Alkaline Storage Batteries
67. U.S. patent 0,879,612 – Alkaline Storage Battery
68. U.S. patent 0,879,859 – Apparatus for Producing Very Thin Sheet Metal
69. U.S. patent 0,880,484 – Process of Producing Very Thin Sheet Metal
70. U.S. patent 0,880,978 – Electrode Element for Storage Batteries
71. U.S. patent 0,880,979 – Method of Making Storage-Battery Electrodes
72. U.S. patent 0,882,144 – Storage-Battery Electrode
73. U.S. patent 0,890,625 – Apparatus for Grinding Coal
74. U.S. patent 0,896,811 – Metallic Film for Use with Storage-Battery Electrodes and Process of Preparing the Same
75. U.S. patent 0,896,812 – Storage Battery
76. U.S. patent 0,898,404 – Process of Making Articles by Electroplating
77. U.S. patent 0,898,633 – Filling Apparatus for Storage-Battery Jars & c.
78. U.S. patent 0,909,167 – Waterproofing-Paint for Portland-Cement Buildings
79. U.S. patent 0,909,168 – Waterproofing Fibers and Fabrics
80. U.S. patent 0,909,169 – Waterproofing-Paint for Portland-Cement Structures
81. U.S. patent 0,909,877 – Telegraphy
82. U.S. patent 0,914,342 – Storage Battery
83. U.S. patent 0,914,343 – Process of Making Storage-Battery Electrodes
84. U.S. patent 0,914,372 – Process for Making Thin Metallic Flakes
85. U.S. patent 0,923,633 – Shaft-Coupling
86. U.S. patent 0,930,946 – Apparatus for Burning Portland Cement
87. U.S. patent 0,930,947 – Gas-Purifier
88. U.S. patent 0,930,948 – Apparatus for Burning Portland Cement
89. U.S. patent 0,930,949 – Apparatus for Burning Portland Cement
90. U.S. patent 0,936,267 – Feed Mechanism for Phonographs and Other Machines
91. U.S. patent 0,936,433 – Tube-Filling and Tamping Machine
92. U.S. patent 0,936,525 – Process of Making Metallic Films or Flakes
93. U.S. patent 0,939,817 – Cement-Kiln
94. U.S. patent 0,939,992 – Phonographic Recording and Reproducing Machine
95. U.S. patent 0,940,635 – Electrode Element for Storage Batteries
96. U.S. patent 0,941,630 – Process and Apparatus for Artificially Aging or Seasoning Portland Cement
97. U.S. patent 0,943,663 – Horn for Talking-Machines
98. U.S. patent 0,943,664 – Sound-Recording Apparatus
99. U.S. patent 0,944,481 – Process and Apparatus for Artificially Aging or Seasoning Portland Cement
100. U.S. patent 0,946,540 – Storage Battery

=== 901 to 1000 ===
1. U.S. patent 0,947,806 – Automobile (1910)
2. U.S. patent 0,948,542 – Method of Treating Cans of Alkaline Storage Batteries
3. U.S. patent 0,948,558 – Storage-Battery Electrode
4. U.S. patent 0,950,226 – Phonographic Recording Apparatus
5. U.S. patent 0,950,227 – Apparatus for Making Metallic Films or Flakes
6. U.S. patent 0,954,789 – Sprocket-Chain Drive
7. U.S. patent 0,956,317 – Tube-Sealing Machine
8. U.S. patent 0,962,081 – Apparatus for Recording Sounds
9. U.S. patent 0,962,822 – Crushing-Roll
10. U.S. patent 0,962,823 – Crushing-Rolls
11. U.S. patent 0,963,362 – Apparatus for Recording or Reproducing Sounds
12. U.S. patent 0,964,096 – Process of Electroplating
13. U.S. patent 0,964,097 – Device for Viewing Moving Pictures
14. U.S. patent 0,964,221 – Sound-Record
15. U.S. patent 0,967,178 – Tube-Forming Machine
16. U.S. patent 0,970,615 – Method and Apparatus for Making Sound-Records
17. U.S. patent 0,970,616 – Flying-Machine
18. U.S. patent 0,975,339 – Process of Duplicating Talking-Machine Records
19. U.S. patent 0,975,340 – Phonograph-Reproducer
20. U.S. patent 0,976,791 – Storage-Battery Electrode
21. U.S. patent 0,976,792 – Storage Battery
22. U.S. patent 0,991,433 – Bucket Conveyor
23. U.S. patent 0,993,294 – Device for Feeding Pulverulent Material
24. U.S. patent 0,996,070 – Rotary Kiln
25. U.S. patent 0,996,625 – Phonograph-Reproducer
26. U.S. patent 0,999,762 – Storage Battery and Process of Treating the Same
27. U.S. patent 1,002,504 – Crushing and Separating Fine Materials
28. U.S. patent 1,002,505 – Composition for Sound-Records and Other Objects
29. U.S. patent 1,012,250 – Recording-Telephone
30. U.S. patent 1,012,828 – Storage Battery
31. U.S. patent 1,013,869 – Bearing
32. U.S. patent 1,014,818 – Giant Rolls
33. U.S. patent 1,016,874 – Means and Method for Preventing Depletion of Electrolyte
34. U.S. patent 1,016,875 – Electroplating Apparatus
35. U.S. patent 1,019,440 – Phonograph-Reproducer
36. U.S. patent 1,019,441 – Sound-Recording Apparatus
37. U.S. patent 1,020,485 – Phonograph-Reproducer
38. U.S. patent 1,024,839 – Phonographic Recording-Stylus
39. U.S. patent 1,034,002 – Storage Battery
40. U.S. patent 1,034,003 – Battery-Cell Container
41. U.S. patent 1,036,470 – Phonographic Apparatus
42. U.S. patent 1,036,471 – Storage Battery
43. U.S. patent 1,041,756 – Conveyor
44. U.S. patent 1,041,983 – Phonograph-Stylus
45. U.S. patent 1,046,159 – Phonograph-Reproducer
46. U.S. patent 1,046,414 – Phonograph Determining Device
47. U.S. patent 1,050,355 – Phonograph
48. U.S. patent 1,050,436 – Apparatus for Producing Rubber Strips
49. U.S. patent 1,050,629 – Art of Separating Copper from Other Metals
50. U.S. patent 1,050,630 – Art of Separating Copper from Other Metals
51. U.S. patent 1,052,656 – Phonograph-Reproducer
52. U.S. patent 1,055,524 – Dumping Mechanism
53. U.S. patent 1,055,621 – The Reproducer
54. U.S. patent 1,056,517 – Means for Reproducing Sound
55. U.S. patent 1,059,661 – Manufacture of Portland Cement
56. U.S. patent 1,065,597 – Cement-Burning Kiln
57. U.S. patent 1,073,107 – Storage Battery
58. U.S. patent 1,078,264 – Phonographic Recording or Reproducing Apparatus
59. U.S. patent 1,078,265 – Process of Making Phonograph-Records
60. U.S. patent 1,078,266 – Sound-Box
61. U.S. patent 1,083,353 – Production of Perforated Strips
62. U.S. patent 1,083,354 – Insulating Compound
63. U.S. patent 1,083,355 – Art of Forming Chemical Compounds
64. U.S. patent 1,083,356 – Storage Battery
65. U.S. patent 1,099,241 – Rectifier
66. U.S. patent 1,099,346 – Phonograph-Reproducer
67. U.S. patent 1,099,347 – Phonograph-Reproducer
68. U.S. patent 1,099,348 – Phonograph-Reproducer
69. U.S. patent 1,099,349 – Method of Making Sound-Record Molds
70. U.S. patent 1,106,444 – Fuel-Feeding Apparatus
71. U.S. patent 1,110,382 – Sound-Modifier
72. U.S. patent 1,110,428 – Process of Forming Phonograph-Styli
73. U.S. patent 1,111,999 – Phonograph-Record
74. U.S. patent 1,115,463 – Electrode Element
75. U.S. patent 1,118,114 – Method of Making Molds for Sound-Records
76. U.S. patent 1,119,141 – Sound-Reproducer
77. U.S. patent 1,119,142 – Sound-Record
78. U.S. patent 1,123,261 – Mold for Concrete Construction
79. U.S. patent 1,126,428 – Sound-Recording Apparatus
80. U.S. patent 1,130,156 – Machine for Shaving Sound Records or Blanks
81. U.S. patent 1,138,360 – Method of Presenting the Illusion of Scenes in Colors
82. U.S. patent 1,142,507 – Sound-Recording Apparatus
83. U.S. patent 1,143,818 – Charging Storage Batteries
84. U.S. patent 1,146,413 – Method of Producing Tablets for Sound-Records
85. U.S. patent 1,146,414 – Method of Making Phonograph-Records
86. U.S. patent 1,148,832 – Means for Utilizing the Waste Heat in Kilns
87. U.S. patent 1,152,613 – Method of Burning Portland-Cement Clinker
88. U.S. patent 1,152,614 – Phonographic Recording Apparatus
89. U.S. patent 1,152,615 – Alternating-Current-Rectifying System
90. U.S. patent 1,152,616 – Contact for Electrical Apparatus
91. U.S. patent 1,158,659 – Phonograph-Record
92. U.S. patent 1,158,660 – Phonograph-Record
93. U.S. patent 1,158,661 – Phonograph or Talking-Machine
94. U.S. patent 1,163,329 – Filament for Incandescent Electric Lamps
95. U.S. patent 1,167,484 – Production of Nickel Hydroxid
96. U.S. patent 1,167,485 – Storage Battery
97. U.S. patent 1,167,637 – Method of Utilizing Waste Heat in Kilns
98. U.S. patent 1,167,638 – Means for Concentrating Ores
99. U.S. patent 1,178,062 – Moving-Picture Apparatus
100. U.S. patent 1,178,063 – Receptacle-Filling Machine

=== 1001 to 1084 ===
This series of patents focus mainly on the phonograph and other talking-machines. There are several battery patents included in this portion of legal protections.

1. U.S. patent 1,182,897 – Apparatus for Recording and Reproducing Motion and Sounds (1916)
2. U.S. patent 1,184,332 – Phonograph or Talking-Machine
3. U.S. patent 1,184,333 – Phonograph or Talking-Machine
4. U.S. patent 1,184,334 – Phonograph or Talking-Machine
5. U.S. patent 1,190,133 – Means for Recording Sounds
6. U.S. patent 1,192,400 – Electrical System for Automobiles
7. U.S. patent 1,197,723 – Coating Apparatus
8. U.S. patent 1,198,426 – Production of Electrode Elements
9. U.S. patent 1,201,448 – Coating Apparatus
10. U.S. patent 1,201,449 – Sound-Modifying Device
11. U.S. patent 1,204,420 – Sound-Box
12. U.S. patent 1,207,382 – Primary Battery
13. U.S. patent 1,207,383 – Sound-Record Tablet
14. U.S. patent 1,219,272 – Process of Constructing Concrete Buildings
15. U.S. patent 1,221,981 – Alternating-Current Rectifier
16. U.S. patent 1,234,450 – Celluloid Record-Blank
17. U.S. patent 1,234,451 – Mold or Transfer Plate
18. U.S. patent 1,248,468 – Celluloid Record-Blank
19. U.S. patent 1,255,517 – Starting and Current-Supplying System for Automobiles
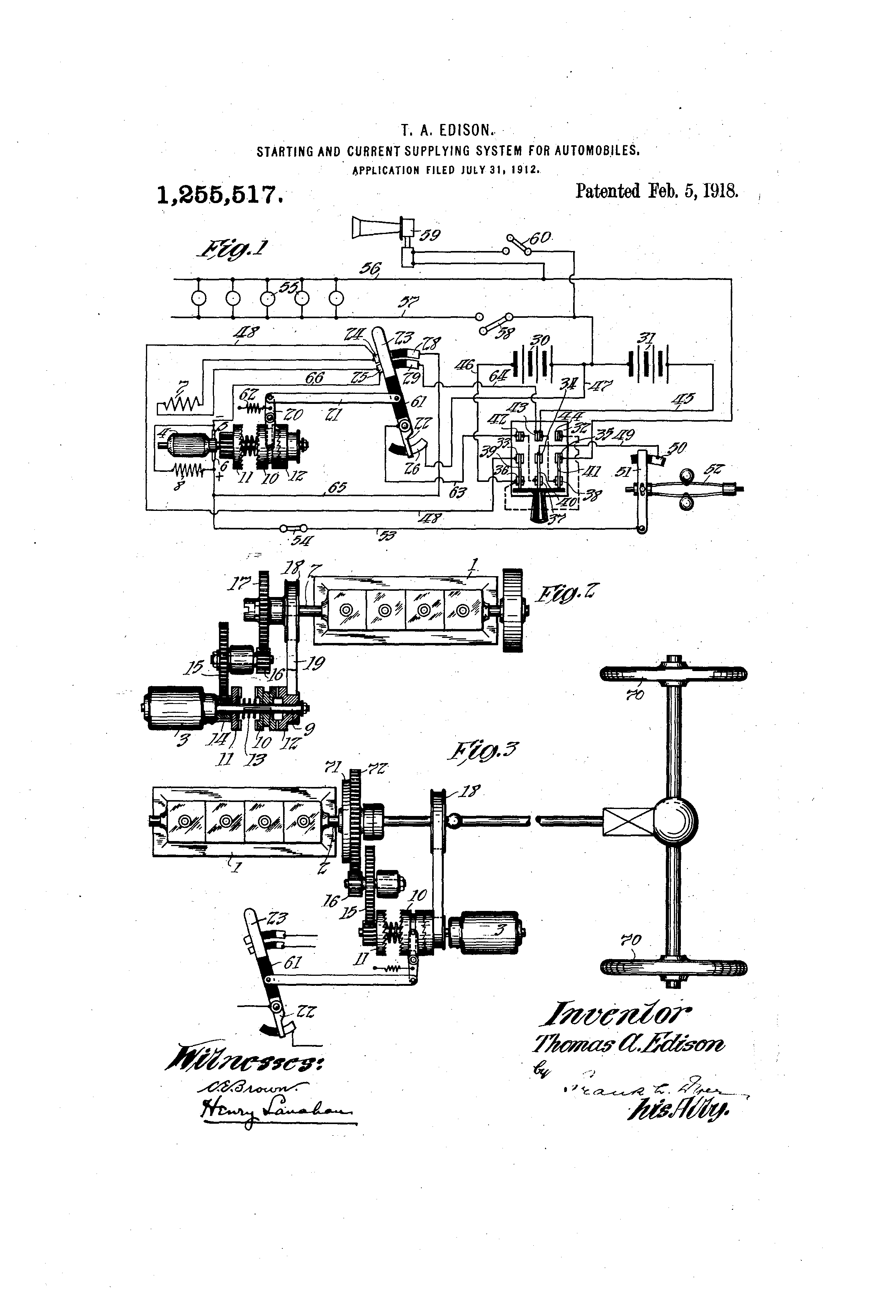
  US1255517. Starting and current supplying system for automobiles.
20. U.S. patent 1,266,778 – Process of Making Screens for Projection
21. U.S. patent 1,266,779 – Electric Safety-Lantern
22. U.S. patent 1,266,780 – Storage Battery
23. U.S. patent 1,275,232 – Production of Finely-Divided Metals
24. U.S. patent 1,283,706 – Para-phenylene-di-amin Substance and Process Relating Thereto
25. U.S. patent 1,286,259 – Means for Recording Sounds
26. U.S. patent 1,290,138 – Friction Speed-Governor
27. U.S. patent 1,292,277 – Swaging-Machine
28. U.S. patent 1,297,294 – Projectile
29. U.S. patent 1,299,693 – Storage Battery
30. U.S. patent 1,300,708 – Projectile
31. U.S. patent 1,300,709 – Projectile
32. U.S. patent 1,311,955 – Tube Filling and Tamping Machine
33. U.S. patent 1,323,218 – Method and Means for Improving the Rendition of Musical Compositions
34. U.S. patent 1,326,330 – Mold for Sound-Records
35. U.S. patent 1,326,854 – Apparatus for the Production of Concrete Structures
36. U.S. patent 1,342,326 – Composition of Matter for Sound-Records or the Like and Process of Making the Same
37. U.S. patent 1,359,972 – Electroplating
38. U.S. patent 1,364,358 – Battery-Tray
39. U.S. patent 1,364,359 – Protecting-Varnish for Electrodes of Electrolytic Cells
40. U.S. patent 1,369,271 – Cleaning of Metallic Surfaces
41. U.S. patent 1,369,272 – Process of Molding
42. U.S. patent 1,371,414 – Nickel-Plating
43. U.S. patent 1,377,192 – Production of Molded Articles
44. U.S. patent 1,377,193 – Production of Molded Articles
45. U.S. patent 1,377,194 – Storage Battery
46. U.S. patent 1,379,088 – Storage Battery
47. U.S. patent 1,379,089 – Production of Thin Metallic Sheets or Foils
48. U.S. patent 1,386,095 – Electrode Element for Galvanic Batteries and Method of Producing ame
49. U.S. patent 1,402,751 – Storage-Battery Electrode and the Production of Same : Gives an increase discharge rate via lowering internal resistance
50. U.S. patent 1,410,391 – Protective Coating for Steel and Iron
51. U.S. patent 1,411,425 – Production of Molded Articles
52. U.S. patent 1,417,463 – Mold
53. U.S. patent 1,417,464 – Production of Thin Metal Sheets or Foils
54. U.S. patent 1,425,183 – Transmitter
55. U.S. patent 1,425,184 – Production of Thin Metal Sheets or Foils
56. U.S. patent 1,425,458 – Stylus Mounting
57. U.S. patent 1,456,687 – Stylus Mounting
58. U.S. patent 1,488,480 – Regeneration of Alkaline Storage-Battery Elements
59. U.S. patent 1,488,481 – Regeneration of Storage-Battery Elements
60. U.S. patent 1,489,240 – Voltaic Battery and the Production of Electrode Elements Therefor
61. U.S. patent 1,492,023 – Sound Record
62. U.S. patent 1,495,580 – Method of Producing Chlorinated Rubber
63. U.S. patent 1,526,326 – Storage Battery
64. U.S. patent 1,546,573 – Production of Disk Phonograph Records
65. U.S. patent 1,559,562 – Storage Battery
66. U.S. patent 1,583,783 – Centrifugal Speed Governor
67. U.S. patent 1,599,121 – Production of Depolarizing Agent for Voltaic Battery
68. U.S. patent 1,600,722 – Mounting for Diamonds and the Like
69. U.S. patent 1,644,670 – Cabinet
70. U.S. patent 1,649,579 – Storage-Battery Electrode Element and Production Thereof
71. U.S. patent 1,651,196 – Storage Battery
72. U.S. patent 1,678,246 – Production of Alkali-Metal Compounds from Silicates Containing Them
73. U.S. patent 1,690,159 – Method of Producing Sound-Record Tablets
74. U.S. patent 1,702,935 – Receiving Apparatus for Radio and Telephone Circuits
75. U.S. patent 1,708,692 – Phonograph
76. U.S. patent 1,711,265 – Phonograph Reproducer
77. U.S. patent 1,723,609 – Apparatus for Producing Storage-Battery Electrode Elements
78. U.S. patent 1,740,079 – Extraction of Rubber from Plants
79. U.S. patent 1,744,533 – Mounting for Diaphragms of Sound Boxes
80. U.S. patent 1,744,534 – Production of Molded Articles
81. U.S. patent 1,829,856 – Dynamo-Electric Machine
82. U.S. patent 1,836,066 – Electroplating Apparatus
83. U.S. patent 1,862,740 – Production of Molded Articles
84. U.S. patent 1,908,830 – Holder for Article to be Electroplated

=== Design patents ===
Edison obtained a few design patents for the unique appearance and concept of items, giving Edison an industrial design right. His design patents are for phonograph cabinets and light bulbs with substantial decorative features.

1. U.S. patent D012631 – Design for an Incandescent Electric Lamp
2. U.S. patent D013940 – Design for Incandescing Electric Lamp
3. U.S. patent D040527 – Design for a Phonograph-Cabinet
4. U.S. patent D042934 – Design for a Cabinet
5. U.S. patent D066227 – Design for a Grille for Phonograph Cabinets
6. U.S. patent D066228 – Design for a Grille for Phonograph Cabinets
7. U.S. patent D069068 – Design for a Phonograph Cabinet
8. U.S. patent D069688 – Design for a Phonograph Cabinet
9. U.S. patent D069689 – Design for a Phonograph Cabinet

=== Improvements ===
- Lewis Latimer patented an improved method of producing the filament in light bulbs (there is no evidence that this was ever used by an Edison company)
- Emile Berliner developed the gramophone, which is essentially an improved phonograph, with the main difference being the use of flat records with spiral grooves.
- Edward H. Johnson had light bulbs specially made, hand-wired, and displayed at his home on Fifth Avenue in New York City on the first electrically illuminated Christmas tree on December 22, 1882.

== See also ==
- Phonograph
- Incandescent light bulb
- Electric locomotive
- Kinetoscope
- Fluorescent lamp
- Nickel-iron battery

== Related links and patent resources ==
- Thomas Edison's Patents – Rutgers University
- Dyer, Frank Lewis, "Edison, His Life And Inventions". (Worldwideschool.org)
