= Li Junyi =

Li Junyi may refer to:

- Lee Chun-yi (born 1965), Taiwanese politician
- Lee Chun-yee (born 1959), Taiwanese politician
- Junyi Li, American electrical engineer
