= Melvin De Groote =

American chemist and prolific inventor

Melvin De Groote (February 27, 1895 – February 3, 1963) was an American chemist and prolific inventor. He was listed on 925 U.S utility patents, making him the all-time seventeenth most prolific inventor and tenth among US inventors as of December 19, 2017. Time magazine's millennium issue recognized him as second to Thomas Edison in this regard. The article omitted non-US citizens.

De Groote invented and patented many of the de-emulsifying agents that separate crude oil from salt, sulfur, and water. Without de-emulsification, most of the oil pumped in the US for the last century would have been too corrosive for pipelines or tankers and would have been discarded.

Petrolite was De Groote's employer of 36 years. De Groote was recruited to the firm from the Mellon Institute in 1924 upon the death of the company's founder, William S. Barnickel.

Of Dutch-Jewish ancestry, De Groote was born in Wheeling, West Virginia on February 27, 1895, to Luis De Groote and Jennie De Groote (née Fuld). He attended the Sistersville, West Virginia High School. De Groote graduated from Ohio State University in 1915 with a degree in chemical engineering. He took a second chemical engineering degree in 1942, also from Ohio State, and was awarded an honorary Doctorate of Science in 1955. He was awarded the Lamme Medal in 1950 by the College of Engineering for "meritorious achievement in engineering and the chemical arts". He was also a member of Tau Beta Pi, an engineering society.

De Groote, in his work in flavorings at the Mellon Institute, was rumored to have been hired by Coca-Cola to re-formulate its syrups to eliminate the alcoholic ingredients that were outlawed during prohibition (the company does not acknowledge any changes to its recipes).

De Groote died on February 3, 1963, in St. Louis, Missouri, at the age of 67.
