= Len Lauer =

Len Lauer (1958 – April 12, 2020) was president and CEO of Memjet. He launched Memjet's color printing technology, developed by Silverbrook Research. Lauer oversees operations, engineering, OEM partner development and manufacturing as well as all strategy and direction for Memjet’s global commercial business units. The company supplies technologies and components to OEM partners across the printing industry. Memjet maintains its corporate office in San Diego, and has offices in Dublin, Sydney, Taipei, Singapore and Boise, Idaho.

In interviews with the Associated Press and USA Today at the 2011 Consumer Electronics Show (CES), Lauer said that Memjet is working to create a new category of fast, affordable color printing, and bringing "revolutionary change to the industry."

Lauer told the Irish Times that Memjet's core competency is designing printing technology that "has the capability to be very fast and inexpensive."

Prior to joining Memjet, Lauer worked as executive vice president and chief operating officer of Qualcomm, Inc. Lauer made the move to Qualcomm after 9 years of working with Sprint. Lauer joined Sprint in 1998 and held many executive positions including president of Sprint PCS, president of Sprint Business, president of Sprint's consumer services group, and president of the global markets group. He served as president and chief operating officer before the merger between Sprint and Nextel where he directed Sprint’s initiative to provide converged media and communication services.

Lauer also served as president and CEO of Bell Atlantic in New Jersey and accumulated 13 years at IBM working in a management position overseeing sales and marketing. Lauer was on the board of directors for Western Digital.
