= List of prolific inventors =

The 100 known most prolific inventors based on worldwide utility patents are shown in the following table. While in many cases this is the number of utility patents granted by the United States Patent and Trademark Office, it may include utility patents granted by other countries, as noted by the source references for an inventor.

== Prolific Inventors ==
Inventor	Pats	Fams	Fam %	Pat Yrs	Yrs	Pat /Yr	Inv /Pat	Pat Residence	Majority Assignment
Shunpei Yamazaki	6786	3013	44.4%	1972—2026	54.6	124	3.6	Japan	Semiconductor Energy Laboratory
Tao Luo	4824	4056	84.1%	2006—2026	20.5	235	5.6	USA	Qualcomm
Kia Silverbrook	4747	1311	27.6%	1994—2014	20	237	1.6	Australia	Silverbrook Research
Junyi Li	2916	2485	85.2%	2002—2026	24	122	5.2	USA	Qualcomm
Kangguo Cheng	2875	1608	55.9%	2004—2026	22	131	3.9	USA	IBM
Frederick E. Shelton IV	2767	1268	45.8%	2005—2026	21.4	129	4.5	USA	Ethicon
Peter Gaal	2722	2113	77.6%	2002—2026	24.2	112	5.9	USA	Qualcomm
Wanshi Chen	2481	1907	76.9%	2009—2026	17.5	142	5.7	USA	Qualcomm
Xiaoxia Zhang	2419	2067	85.4%	2009—2026	17.8	136	5.5	USA	Qualcomm
Esmael H. Dinan	2214	978	44.2%	2006—2026	20.4	109	3.6	USA	Ofinno
Jing Sun	2031	1718	84.6%	2012—2026	13.9	146	5.9	USA	Qualcomm
Lowell L. Wood, Jr.	2003	1328	66.3%	1971—2026	54.3	37	8.8	USA	Intellectual Ventures
Chen-Hua Yu	1998	1045	52.3%	1996—2026	30.4	66	4.9	Taiwan	TSMC
Roderick A. Hyde	1893	1252	66.1%	2001—2023	22.4	85	8.7	USA	Intellectual Ventures
Shan Liu	1881	1208	64.2%	2013—2026	13.2	142	3.4	USA	Tencent
Hanbyul Seo	1860	1398	75.2%	2012—2026	14.5	128	3.8	South Korea	LG
Sarbajit K. Rakshit	1653	1423	86.1%	2013—2026	13.8	120	3.4	India	IBM
Jun Koyama	1519	619	40.8%	1991—2026	34.9	44	3.1	Japan	Semiconductor Energy Laboratory
Yunjung Yi	1485	1001	67.4%	2011—2026	15.8	94	3.3	USA	LG
Ruilong Xie	1477	1200	81.2%	2013—2026	13.8	107	4.2	USA	IBM
Gurtej Singh Sandhu	1437	584	40.6%	1991—2024	32.5	44	2.5	USA	Micron
Suckchel Yang	1355	900	66.4%	2013—2026	13.3	102	4.7	South Korea	LG
Yan Zhou	1338	1193	89.2%	2012—2026	14.2	94	4.4	USA	Qualcomm
Alexander Reznicek	1325	817	61.7%	2006—2026	20.5	65	3.9	USA	IBM
Juan Montojo	1324	1082	81.7%	2004—2026	22.7	58	6.9	USA	Qualcomm
Shou-Shan Fan	1319	1104	83.7%	2006—2026	20.5	64	4.2	China	Hon Hai
Satoshi Seo	1318	637	48.3%	2002—2026	23.9	55	4.1	Japan	Semiconductor Energy Laboratory
Paul Lapstun	1307	247	18.9%	2000—2026	25.2	52	2.5	Australia	Silverbrook Research
Takahiro Nishi	1300	406	31.2%	2001—2026	25.2	52	6.3	Japan	Panasonic
Clarence T. Tegreene	1254	904	72.1%	2000—2025	24.8	51	10.1	USA	Intellectual Ventures
Marta Karczewicz	1239	1024	82.6%	2000—2026	25.9	48	4.0	USA	Qualcomm
Jason L. Harris	1232	675	54.8%	2011—2026	15.6	79	6.0	USA	Ethicon
Kijun Kim	1197	836	69.8%	2013—2026	12.9	93	4.6	South Korea	LG
Joonkui Ahn	1186	773	65.2%	2013—2026	13.2	90	4.7	South Korea	LG
Seungmin Lee	1161	890	76.7%	2014—2026	12.1	96	3.5	South Korea	LG
Tingfang Ji	1159	861	74.3%	2006—2026	20.3	57	6.9	USA	Qualcomm
Hao Xu	1151	873	75.8%	2005—2026	21.6	53	4.7	China	Qualcomm
Edward K. Y. Jung	1112	794	71.4%	1996—2022	26.1	43	8.0	USA	Intellectual Ventures
Leonard Forbes	1109	411	37.1%	1975—2019	43.3	26	2.6	USA	Micron
Thomas Edison	1084	NA	NA	1869—1933	63.9	17	1.0	USA	Thomas Edison
Jason K. Resch	1079	516	47.8%	2009—2026	17.2	63	4.2	USA	IBM
Satoshi Nagata	1075	1038	96.6%	2011—2026	15.1	71	4.0	Japan	NTT
Rick Allen Hamilton II	1065	716	67.2%	1999—2026	27.3	39	4.2	USA	IBM
Justin T. Mason	1065	1061	99.6%	2008—2026	18	59	1.0	USA	MS Technologies
Ahmadreza Rofougaran	1034	493	47.7%	2002—2026	24.4	42	6.4	USA	Broadcom
Hua Zhou	1015	551	54.3%	2012—2026	14.7	69	5.5	USA	Ofinno
Kyungmin Park	1012	489	48.3%	2014—2026	12.5	81	5.2	USA	Ofinno
Donald E. Weder	1000	395	39.5%	1978—2015	37.1	27	1.1	USA	Weder Family Trust
Michael J. Sullivan	997	534	53.6%	1989—2024	34.5	29	3.8	USA	Acushnet Holdings
George Albert Lyon	993	NA	NA	1901—1965	64.5	15	1.0	Canada	Lyon George Albert
Jordin T. Kare	993	640	64.5%	1992—2023	30.5	33	9.1	USA	Intellectual Ventures
William H. Eby	985	981	99.6%	1994—2026	32.5	30	1.2	USA	Monsanto
Jay S. Walker	981	539	54.9%	1998—2024	26.3	37	5.2	USA	Walker Digital
Hajime Kimura	973	314	32.3%	2002—2026	24	41	2.6	Japan	Semiconductor Energy Laboratory
John F. O'Connor	949	NA	NA	1901—1935	33.9	28	NA	USA	William H. Miner
Hongyuan Zhang	937	517	55.2%	2009—2026	17.5	54	3.9	USA	Marvell
Chih-Chao Yang	936	617	65.9%	2003—2026	22.9	41	3.4	USA	IBM
Stuart C. Salter	932	874	93.8%	2009—2026	16.9	55	4.8	USA	Ford
David R. Hall	927	766	82.6%	1985—2026	40.7	23	3.8	USA	Hall Labs
Melvin De Groote	925	NA	NA	1924—1966	41.8	22	NA	USA	Petrolite
Nathan Myhrvold	912	615	67.4%	1994—2026	32	28	11.1	USA	Intellectual Ventures
Francis H. Richards	894	NA	NA	1899—1930	30.8	29	NA	USA	Francis H. Richards
Mark Malamud	886	690	77.9%	1997—2022	25.1	35	7.5	USA	Intellectual Ventures
Youngdae Lee	883	703	79.6%	2014—2026	12.6	70	3.1	South Korea	LG
Hsien-Wei Chen	881	405	46.0%	2005—2026	21.6	41	3.5	Taiwan	TSMC
Robert W. Lord	871	683	78.4%	2003—2025	21.6	40	7.6	USA	Intellectual Ventures
Hyoungsuk Jeon	859	436	50.8%	2009—2026	16.9	51	5.6	USA	Ofinno
Royce A. Levien	855	666	77.9%	1997—2020	23.4	37	6.8	USA	Intellectual Ventures
Lee D. Whetsel	855	128	15.0%	1991—2017	26.4	32	1.1	USA	Texas Instruments
SungDuck Chun	846	531	62.8%	2007—2026	18.8	45	3.8	South Korea	LG
Muriel Y. Ishikawa	840	560	66.7%	2002—2023	21.2	40	11.1	USA	Intellectual Ventures
Michael K. Gschwind	837	442	52.8%	2001—2021	20.6	41	2.6	USA	IBM
Clifford A. Pickover	837	548	65.5%	1992—2024	32.2	26	3.9	USA	IBM
Devendra K. Sadana	830	472	56.9%	1983—2026	43.5	19	4.3	USA	IBM
Xue Dong	827	797	96.4%	2010—2026	15.9	52	7.4	China	BOE
Jean-Philippe M. Vasseur	810	665	82.1%	2006—2026	20.5	40	2.6	France	Cisco Systems
Frederick A. Ware	804	234	29.1%	1981—2026	44.9	18	2.8	USA	Rambus
Toshiyasu Sugio	802	294	36.7%	2009—2026	17.1	47	4.9	Japan	Panasonic
Salman A. Akram	789	294	37.3%	1995—2026	30.7	26	2.9	USA	Micron
James A. Jorasch	779	309	39.7%	1994—2023	29	27	3.9	USA	Walker Digital
Shougo Sato	777	295	38.0%	1992—2026	34	23	1.8	Japan	Brother
Warren M. Farnworth	774	289	37.3%	1990—2014	24.4	32	2.8	USA	Micron
Bruce B. Doris	768	435	56.6%	1995—2025	30.3	25	4.2	USA	IBM
Chung-Shi Liu	762	401	52.6%	2000—2026	26.5	29	6.1	Taiwan	TSMC
Ali Khakifirooz	760	415	54.6%	2011—2026	14.4	53	4.2	USA	IBM
Jonghyun Park	760	541	71.2%	2013—2026	13.8	55	3.8	USA	LG
Jeyhan Karaoguz	757	371	49.0%	1996—2020	23.8	32	4.6	USA	Broadcom
Carleton Ellis	753	NA	NA	1902—1946	43.1	17	NA	USA	Ellis Foster Co
Woosuk Ko	740	337	45.5%	2015—2026	11.5	64	3.4	South Korea	LG
John M. Santosuosso	738	466	63.1%	2001—2022	20.7	36	3.9	USA	IBM
Moon-il Lee	734	408	55.6%	2010—2026	15.9	46	5.3	USA	LG
Hideo Ando	733	123	16.8%	1983—2020	36.7	20	3.1	Japan	Toshiba
Lawrence A. Clevenger	729	484	66.4%	1996—2026	30.5	24	5.1	USA	IBM
Gregory J. Boss	728	504	69.2%	2008—2026	18.7	39	4.2	USA	IBM
Lisa Seacat DeLuca	727	530	72.9%	2009—2026	17.1	43	2.7	USA	IBM
Xiaochuan Chen	726	701	96.6%	2014—2026	12.3	59	7.0	China	BOE
George Spector	723	723	100%	1974—1998	24.6	29	2.1	USA	George Spector
Aleksandar Damnjanovic	721	533	73.9%	2003—2026	23.3	31	4.4	USA	Qualcomm
Austin L. Gurney	718	182	25.3%	1999—2021	21.6	33	2.9	USA	Genentech
Eric C. Leuthardt	704	474	67.3%	2006—2026	20	35	9.1	USA	Intellectual Ventures

This table is usually updated every Tuesday, and is current as of November 17, 2026.

The columns are defined as follows:

- Inventor: The name of the inventor.
- Pats: The number of utility patents that have been issued. Only utility patents (or the international equivalent) are listed, as a utility patent is a patent for an invention. Not all patents are for inventions. Other patent types include: design patents for the ornamental design of an object; plant patents for plant varieties; and reissue patents, where a correction is made to an already granted patent. This list does not include patent applications (patents pending) as there is no guarantee that a patent application actually describes a novel invention until the patent is granted.
- Fams: The number of patent families, which in USPTO data includes an original or continuation-in-part patent by itself or with one or more continuation or divisional patents based on the original or continuation-in-part patent. This is different than global patent families that represent a patent filed in more than one jurisdiction. "NA" signifies the inventor was active prior to digital records.
- Fam %: The percentage of original and continuation-in-part patents that are in the inventor's patent portfolio [Fams column divided by Pats column, rounded to first decimal as a percentage]. "NA" signifies the inventor was active prior to digital records.
- Pat Yrs: The first and last year in which an inventor received a patent issuance.
- Yrs: The number of years from first issuance to most recent issuance, rounded to first decimal based on dates.
- Pats /Yr: The average number of patents received per year [Pats column divided by Yrs column, rounded].
- Inv / Pat: The average number of inventors listed on the inventor's most recent 50 patents as of September 7, 2021 or on the date the inventor was added to the table if later. "NA" signifies the inventor was active prior to digital records.
- Pat Residence: The country of inventor's residence listed in their most recent patent issuance.
- Majority Assignment: The entity that has the most patents assigned from an inventor's portfolio. This is current and not original assignment. It is usually, but not always an indication of which company the inventor worked at for the majority of their patent activity.

== Significance of inventions ==
This table is a sortable list of the most prolific inventors as measured by utility patents granted. It does not include other types of invention, such as inventions that were never applied for nor granted, for which there is no known source. Nor does the table attempt to measure the significance of an inventor and their inventions. The significance of inventions is often not apparent until many decades after the invention has been made. For recent inventors, it is not yet possible to determine their place in history.

== Various published lists ==
Rankings of prolific inventors have been published at various times. However, until the patent records were digitized, these lists were very tedious to prepare, as many thousands of patent records had to be checked manually. Even after digitization, it is still not a simple process. While the USPTO keeps statistics for annual rankings of inventions assigned to companies, it no longer publishes rankings of individual inventors. The last such list was published by the USPTO in 1998. Also, patents predating 1976 have not yet been digitized in the USPTO records. This means that patents before 1976 will not be included in a USPTO search by inventor name, and the number of patents granted before 1976 must be added to current searches.

A more extensive list of prolific inventors with additional information and ability to filter on country, gender, time period, patent type, and Nobel laureate title can be found at idiyas.com/top/inventors. There are some discrepancies with this article due to different inventor queries that attempt to account for data issues such as typos and multiple inventors with the same name.

== See also ==
- Timeline of historic inventions
- List of inventors
