= Mark Malamud =

American programmer (born 1960)

Mark Malamud (born 1960) is the principal and manager of Busymonster LLC, a consultancy focused on advanced user interface and design.

During his 10-year tenure at Microsoft, Malamud became the company's first User Interface Architect, leading design teams in the Advanced Windows, Consumer, Systems, and Research groups.

In addition to designing the fundamental conceptual, user, and interaction models for Windows 95 and future versions of Windows NT, Malamud also pursued future user interface abstractions. Some of his work involved creating psychosocial models of users to improve the interaction between people and machines. Malamud produced Bill Gates’ groundbreaking demo, “Information at Your Fingertips,” which was shown at Fall Comdex in 1990.

Before joining Microsoft, Malamud contributed his expertise to a variety of trade magazines and educational publications. He has created several award-winning educational adventure games for Scholastic Books, and he has worked on various multimedia projects, including Nam June Paik's "Good Morning, Mr. Orwell" for WNET in New York.

Malamud studied at Brown University where he received his A.B. in psychology. He holds over 200 major patents in the area of user interface and has been named as an inventor on over 880 US patents and numerous patents pending.

Malamud has participated in several Intellectual Ventures’ invention sessions relating to user interface, human-technology interaction, information processing, and health informatics. He is on the List of prolific inventors and in 2012 was the 8th most-prolific inventor of US patents.

== See also ==
- List of prolific inventors
