= Donald Weder =

American inventor and businessman (1947–2026)

Donald Weder (September 18, 1947 – September 22, 2026) was an American inventor and businessman. As of February 6, 2013, Weder held 984 utility patents and 413 design patents for a total of 1,397 US patents, which had increased to 1,413 by April 17, 2019. His most famous inventions include the hinged plastic Easter egg, a process for making plastic Easter grass, and decorative florist foil packaging.

== Background ==
Weder was a resident of Highland, Illinois. Weder graduated summa cum laude from Bradley University, and was a member of The Honor Society of Phi Kappa Phi. He died in Deck's Praire, Illinois, on September 22, 2026, at the age of 79.

== Highland Supply Corporation ==
From 1977, Weder was the President of Highland Supply Corporation or "HSC". HSC was founded in 1937 by Donald Weder's father, Erwin Weder, to make corsage containers, and was substantially expanded by Donald Weder. HSC is now offering over 12,000 products for the floriculture industry. Highland Supply Corporation was recognized by Design for the Environment (United States Environmental Protection Agency partnership program) for its commitment to environmental safety. Over the past three decades, Highland Supply claims to have planted well over 100,000 trees at various sites and preserved over 1000 acres [conversion required] of timberland.

== Patents ==
As of February 6, 2013, Weder held 984 utility patents and 413 design patents for a total of 1397 US patents. By April 17, 2019, this had increased to 1,413 total patents.

Weder's patents are mostly related to the floristry industry, although in recent years as his sons Erwin and Andrew increasingly handle business affairs, Weder has turned to other technologies and industries, as well.

His patents are owned by the Weder Family Trust, an offshore asset protection trust of which his sister Wanda Weder (who is also Senior Executive Vice President of Highland Supply Corporation) is trustee. This trust is administered by Southpac Trusts Limited.

== Awards and recognitions ==
Weder was honored by civic, inventor and floral industry organizations for his philanthropy as well as his inventorship.

- Thomas Edison award from the US Patent Office in August 2002 for having passed Edison on August 6, 2002 to become the No. 1 most prolific American US patent holder (2002)
- 1st recipient of the "Donald E Weder Inventor of the Year Award" by the Illinois Innovators and Inventors, Inc. (2002)

== See also ==
- List of prolific inventors
