= Ahmadreza Rofougaran =

Iranian-American electrical engineer, inventor

- Born: Isfahan, Iran
- Citizenship: Iranian-American
- Education: University of California, Los Angeles (BS, MS, PhD)
- Known for: RF CMOS; RF circuit modeling
- Awards: IEEE Industrial Pioneer Award (2018); Member of the National Academy of Engineering
- Scientific career
- Fields: Electrical Engineering; Electronics engineering

Ahmadreza Rofougaran, also known as Reza Rofougaran, is an Iranian-American electrical engineer, inventor, and entrepreneur.

== Early life and education ==
Rofougaran was born in Isfahan, Iran, and moved to the US in the 1980s after the closure of Iranian universities after the 1979 Iranian Revolution to study electrical engineering at the University of California, Los Angeles. Rofougaran obtained his BS in 1986, MS in 1988 and earned his PhD from the University of California, Los Angeles in 1998. His PhD thesis was focused on the development of a fast frequency hopped spectrum wireless system using CMOS integrated circuits and was supported by DARPA and focused on the development of other wireless systems such as GPS using CMOS technology which was supported by DARPA SBIR program.

== Career ==
Rofougaran is best known for pioneering RF CMOS technology and the integration of the RF radio with digital processors to enable short-range wireless connectivity, Bluetooth, and short-range wireless network, Wi-Fi, and millimeter RF.

He is a Fellow of the Institute of Electrical and Electronics Engineers (IEEE) since 2010 for contributions to the integration of RF radios into single-chip CMOS technology, member of the National Academy of Engineering. Rofougaran holds 869 issued U.S. patents and listed as a prolific inventor.

=== Innovent Systems Inc and Movandi ===
In 1998, he and his sister Maryam Rofougaran were the co-founders Innovent Systems Inc, a company based in El Segundo, California, and specializing in the development and research in RF CMOS, RF radio, and digital processing to enable short-range wireless connectivity. In 2000, Broadcom Corporation acquired Innovent Systems for $440 million. In 2005, while working at Broadcom Corporation, Rofougaran managed to integrate multiple wireless systems into single-chip CMOS, which enabled smartphones with Wi-Fi in coexistence with Bluetooth and other wireless systems. He is a Fellow of Broadcom since 2006 for contributions to RF and radio technology that was crucial to building Broadcom's wireless business.

In 2016, Rofougaran and his sister Maryam Rofougaran became the co-founders of Movandi, an Irvine, California-based company specializing in developing 5G wireless network systems.

== Awards and recognitions ==
- 2020 OCBJ Innovator of the Year Award.
- 2020 Ellis Island Medal of Honor.
- 2020 National Academy of Engineering Membership.
- 2018 IEEE Industrial Pioneer Award.
- 2018 Alumnus of the year, Henry Samueli School of Engineering, UCLA.
- 2017 The Top 5 Technology Innovators, Electronic Products Magazine.
- 2014 IEEE Journal of Solid-State Circuits Best Paper Award.
- 2010 IEEE Fellow.
- 2006 Broadcom Fellow.
