= Memjet =

Memjet is a printing technology and components company. It maintains its corporate office in San Diego, California, and has offices in Dublin, Sydney, Taipei, Singapore and Boise, Idaho. Memjet's president and chief executive officer, Len Lauer, was appointed in January 2010. Before joining Memjet, Lauer served as executive vice president and chief operating officer of Qualcomm.

In 2010, first label Memjet printers were announced. In January 2011, Memjet announced that it plans to launch the product first in Asia/Pacific region, expecting release in North America and Europe by the end of 2011.

Memjet's technology was developed by Silverbrook Research, located in Balmain, Australia. Research began in 1994, and a working Memjet prototype printer was displayed at the Consumer Electronics Show in 2009.

Silverbrook Research and their principal financier, The George Kaiser Family Foundation, were in dispute in several fundamental aspects, and Silverbrook Research's office and principal research facility for Memjet in North Ryde, Sydney, Australia was shut down pending resolution. In May 2012, a settlement was announced under which Memjet acquired the technology and restored about 300 jobs to former Silverbrook Research employees who today are part of Memjet.
