= Ofinno =

R&D lab in Virginia

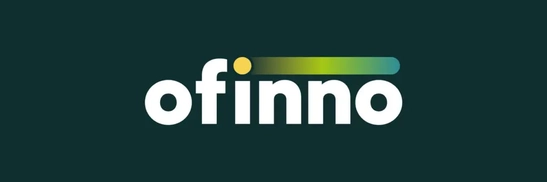
- Logo of Ofinno
- Company type: Private
- Industry: Telecommunications; Electronics; Automotive
- Founded: 2011
- Founder: Esmael Dinan
- Headquarters: Virginia, United States
- Key people: Kavon Nasabzadeh (Chief Executive Officer); Esmael Dinan (Founder & CTO)
- Services: R&D
- Website: ofinno.com

Ofinno is a research and development lab based in Reston, Virginia. It develops and patents technologies for 5G wireless networking, next generation WiFi, integrated circuit, and video compression. It was founded by Esmael Hejazi Dinan (Note: As of November 2022, Dinan is ranked 28th on the list of the 100 known most prolific inventors worldwide) in 2011.

Ofinno have sold more than 500 patents to companies in the consumer electronics, automotive, and telecommunications industries including Honda, Samsung, Xiaomi, Huawei, and Comcast—its biggest client. As of August 2021, Ofinno has 313 active patents in its portfolio.

In November 2020, Samsung Electronics acquired 40 US patents and 31 US patent applications pertaining to wireless technologies from Ofinno.

In May 2021, Honda bought 37 patents from Ofinno. The purchase comprised more than 100 assets pertaining to wireless technologies.

In July 2021, Xiaomi bought 46 patents pertaining to wireless technologies from Ofinno.

In 2022, Ofinno received the Stevie American Business Awards.

As of October 2022, Ofinno is ranked as the first patent producer based on "Patent Quality Scores" of the seventy-four patents issued by the company during the first quarter of 2022 calculated and assigned by Patent Bots.
