= Shunpei Yamazaki =

Japanese inventor

Shunpei Yamazaki (山崎 舜平, Yamazaki Shunpei; born July 8, 1942) is a Japanese inventor in the field of computer science and solid-state physics. He is a prolific inventor who is listed as a named inventor of more than 11,000 patent families and more than 26,000 distinct patent publications for his inventions. In 2005, he was named as the most prolific inventor in history by USA Today. Kia Silverbrook subsequently passed Yamazaki on February 26, 2008. Yamazaki then passed Silverbrook in 2017.

He completed a graduate course at Doshisha University, Graduate School of Engineering.

== Semiconductor Energy Laboratory ==
Shunpei Yamazaki is the president and majority shareholder of research company Semiconductor Energy Laboratory (SEL) in Tokyo. Most of the patents he holds are in relation to computer display technology and held by SEL, with Yamazaki named either individually or jointly as inventor. He has many inventions regarding these.
