= Junyi Li =

American electrical engineer

Junyi Li is an engineer with Qualcomm Inc. in Bridgewater, New Jersey. He was named a Fellow of the Institute of Electrical and Electronics Engineers (IEEE) in 2012 for his contributions to modulation techniques for mobile broadband communications systems.

Junyi is a prolific inventor listed on 1,223 U.S. Utility Patents as of September 13, 2022.
