= Petrolite =

Former American chemical manufacturer

Petrolite Corporation
- Industry: Chemicals, manufacturing
- Founded: 1930
- Founders: William S. Barnickel, Frederick G. Cottrell
- Defunct: 1997
- Fate: Merged with Baker Hughes
- Successor: Baker Hughes
- Headquarters: St Louis, Missouri, United States
- Products: Chemicals
- Brands: Tret-O-Lite

Petrolite Corporation was an American manufacturer of chemicals. Founded in 1930 from the merger of the Tret-O-lite Company with the Petroleum Rectifying Company of California (PETRECO), it was subsequently merged into Baker Hughes Incorporated in 1997.

== History ==
Petrolite Corporation was founded from the work of two men, William S. Barnickel and Dr. Frederick G. Cottrell, who both invented ways to separate water from crude oil. Wet crude, known as roily oil, was a non-profitable substance produced as a by-product of crude oil production. Most drilling companies would attempt to dispose of this wet crude by burning it in large fire pits, as there had been no successful process developed that could separate the water out of the wet crude.

William Barnickel was born in St Louis, Missouri and studied chemistry. During his career, Barnickel worked in Sapulpa, Oklahoma, where he first began working on a way to separate water from crude oil. Barnickel believed that a simple chemical process could be used to recover the crude oil from the wet crude, which would save oil companies wasting millions of barrels of potential product. Barnickel began his work in 1907 and four years later finally had his breakthrough, successfully separating water from crude oil via a chemical process. The discovery lead to the first of several U.S. patents for Barnickel. Barnickel founded the Tret-O-lite Company and marketed his chemical under the same name.

Frederick Cottrell was a physical chemist working at the University of California. Cottrell was already a renowned scientist having developed several inventions, including the process of separating solid particles from flue gases by electricity to eliminate air pollution. In 1908, Cottrell revised this same process to separate water from crude oil and founded the Petroleum Rectifying Company of California (PETRECO).

In 1930, PETRECO and Tret-O-lite merged to form the Petrolite Corporation. Petrolite continued to be an industry leader in demulsification techniques, but also expanded into other technologies. Some of these included preventative measures for sour gas corrosion in oil field wells, electrostatic desalting for the removal of contaminants during crude oil refining, recovering microcrystalline waxes from crude oil tank bottoms, and creation of the first treatment system to purify low-grade fuels used in gas turbine engines. Over the ensuing decades, Petrolite continued to expand its global presence. In addition to its headquarters located in St Louis, Missouri, Petrolite had research and manufacturing facilities in Brea, California, Barnsdall, Oklahoma, and both Houston and Kilgore, Texas. In the 1990s Petrolite also open its international technology center in Liverpool, United Kingdom, the first of its kind outside of North America.

In 1997, Petrolite was merged into Baker Hughes Incorporated as part of its speciality chemicals division.
