= Kia Silverbrook =

Australian inventor, scientist, and serial entrepreneur

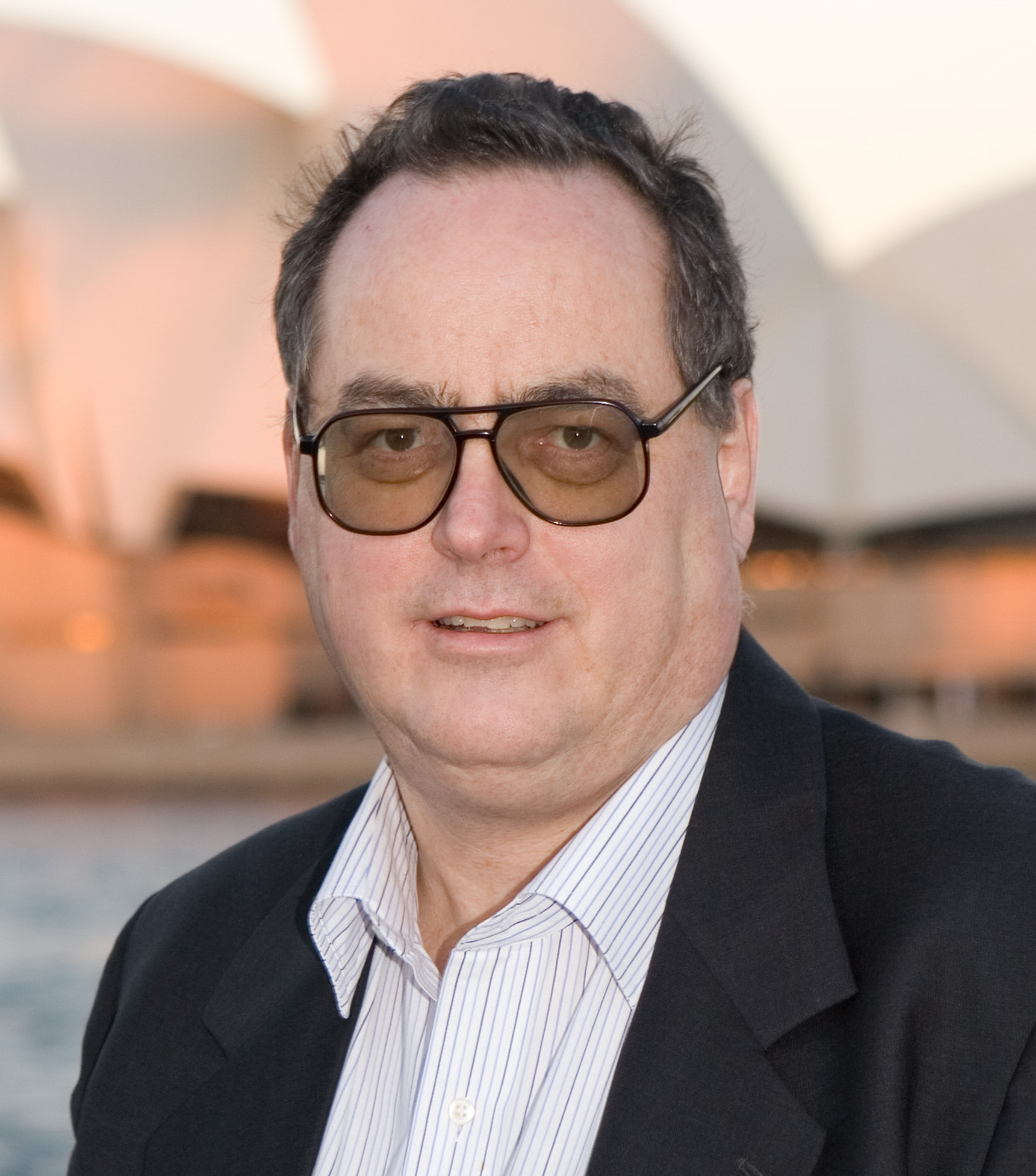
- Silverbrook in 2009
- Born: 1958 (age 67–68); Australia
- Occupations: Inventor; scientist; businessman

Kia Silverbrook (born 1958) is an Australian independent inventor and scientist. He is one of the most prolific inventors in the world, and has been granted 4,747 US utility patents as of 14 February 2022. Internationally, he has 9,874 patents or patent applications registered at the international patent document database (INPADOC). (Note: Difference between numbers of US patents and INPADOC patents is often related to the same invention being patented in several countries, see also patent families) Silverbrook has founded companies and developed products in a wide range of disciplines, including computer graphics, video and audio production, scientific computing, factory automation, digital printing, liquid crystal displays (LCDs), molecular electronics, internet software, content management, genetic analysis, MEMS devices, security inks, photovoltaic solar cells, and interactive paper.

== Early life ==
Silverbrook was born in 1958 in Australia. In 1977 he started at Fairlight Instruments, the developers of the first polyphonic digital sampling synthesizer, the Fairlight CMI. While at Fairlight, he invented and developed the Fairlight CVI, a real-time video effects computer released in 1984. He remained employed by Fairlight Instruments until 1985.

In 1985, Silverbrook founded Integrated Arts, a parallel processing and computer graphics company using the Inmos transputer. Silverbrook was managing director (Australian equivalent of US CEO) of Integrated Arts until 1990.

In 1990 an Australian research subsidiary of the Japanese electronics company Canon was formed, named Canon Information Systems Research Australia (CiSRA). Silverbrook was executive director of CiSRA from its inception until 1994.

== Prolific inventor ==
Between 2008 and 2017, Silverbrook was regarded as the world's most prolific inventor based on issued utility patents. On 26 February 2008 he passed Japanese inventor Shunpei Yamazaki in U.S. utility patents. In 2017 Yamazaki passed Silverbrook to reclaim the lead.

In order to register so many ideas, Silverbrook started a company, Priority Matters, whose purpose was to file his patents.

== Netpage ==
Silverbrook is founder and CEO of Netpage, a company based on technology originally patented by Silverbrook Research in 1999. The technology launched in Esquire magazine.

== Geneasys ==
Silverbrook is founder and chairman of Australian company Geneasys (Genetic Analysis Systems), which is developing "KeyLab" a new class of medical diagnostic device which analyses multiple diseases from DNA using a standard smartphone. The stated goal of Geneasys is "to equip medical professionals, primary care workers, aid workers, veterinarians, military personnel and private citizens with a simple to use, low cost, and highly accurate diagnostic devices".

== Silverbrook Research ==
In 1994 Silverbrook co-founded Silverbrook Research, an Australian research and development and invention licensing company. He is chairman and CEO of Silverbrook Research, which is the developer of the Memjet printer technology, the Hyperlabel alternative to RFID, and the Netpage viewer and digital pen technologies, among others. Since 2001, Silverbrook Research has appeared in the annual listings of the top 200 global companies, as ranked by US patents, climbing as high as the 28th rank in 2008.

== Superlattice Solar ==
In 2011 Silverbrook founded Superlattice Solar, a thin-film solar photovoltaic company targeting an installed cost-per-watt, including balance of systems, sufficiently low for new solar photovoltaic installations to undercut the cost of keeping existing fossil fuel or nuclear power plants operating.

== Memjet ==
In 2002 Silverbrook co-founded Memjet, a printer technology company. Prototype printers were demonstrated at the Consumer Electronics Show (CES 2011), and announced by such major companies as LG, Fuji Xerox, Canon, Toshiba, Lenovo, Océ and Medion. The Memjet technology has won various awards, including Popular Science's "Best of what's new - 2011" and the Edison Awards 2012 Gold Medal.

In March 2012, the George Kaiser Family Foundation (principal investor in Memjet) filed a lawsuit against Silverbrook and Silverbrook Research, alleging fraud and seeking to gain control of the Memjet patent portfolio, numbering over 4,000 patents. Silverbrook's response to the lawsuit characterized it as "part of a hardball commercial negotiation". In May 2012, a settlement was announced under which Memjet acquired control of the technology. All legal claims were withdrawn.

== International patent applications ==
A search of the international patent document database (INPADOC) reveals 9,874 patent documents. The INPADOC database includes patent applications that have not yet been granted, as well as some duplication of patents for different countries, so it gives an overestimate of the number of separate inventions.

== Scientific publications ==
Silverbrook is co-author of a number of papers in The Journal of Chemical Physics, Chemical Physics Letters, and The Journal of Physical Chemistry B. These papers are in the area of carbon nanotubes and the electronic properties of molecular systems.

== See also ==
- List of prolific inventors
