= Recursion =

Process of repeating items in a self-similar way

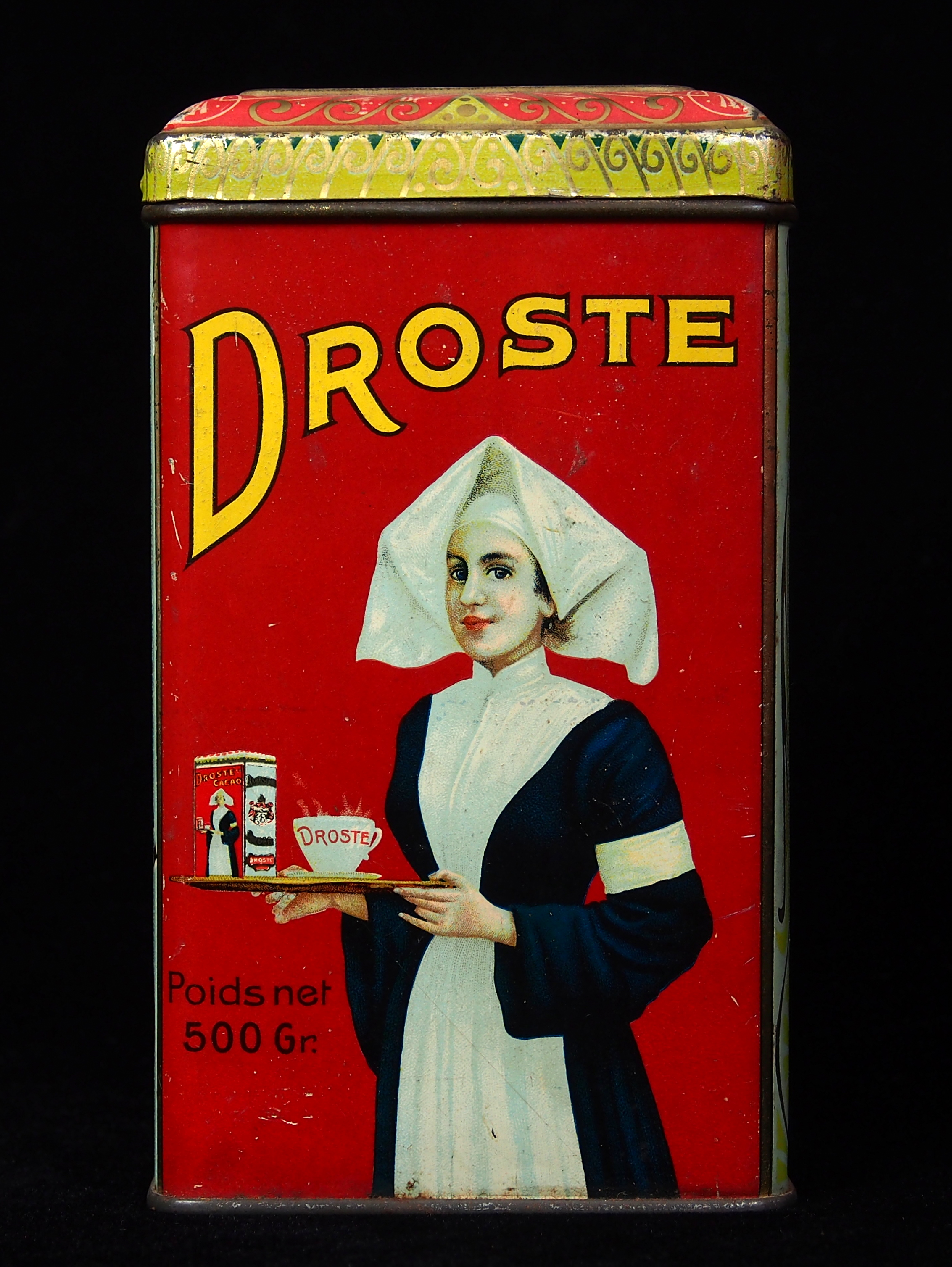
A visual form of recursion known as the Droste effect. The woman in this image holds an object that contains a smaller image of her holding an identical object, which in turn contains a smaller image of herself holding an identical object, and so forth. 1904 Droste cocoa tin, designed by Jan Misset.

Recursion occurs when the definition of a concept or process depends on a simpler or previous version of itself. Recursion is used in a variety of disciplines ranging from linguistics to logic. The most common application of recursion is in mathematics and computer science, where a function being defined is applied within its own definition. While this apparently defines an infinite number of instances (function values), it is often done in such a way that no infinite loop or infinite chain of references can occur.

A process that exhibits recursion is recursive. Video feedback displays recursive images, as does an infinity mirror.

== Formal definitions ==
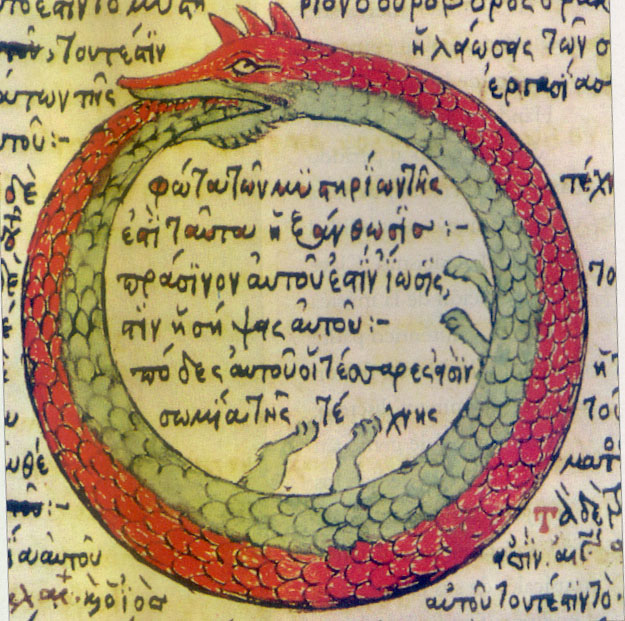
Ouroboros, an ancient symbol depicting a serpent or dragon eating its own tail

In mathematics and computer science, a class of objects or methods exhibits recursive behavior when it can be defined by two properties:

- A simple base case (or cases) — a terminating scenario that does not use recursion to produce an answer
- A recursive step — a set of rules that reduces all successive cases toward the base case.

For example, the following is a recursive definition of a person's ancestor. One's ancestor is either:

- One's parent (base case), or
- One's parent's ancestor (recursive step).

The Fibonacci sequence is another classic example of recursion:

Fib(0) = 0 as base case 1,

Fib(1) = 1 as base case 2,

For all integers n > 1, Fib(n) = Fib(n − 1) + Fib(n − 2).

Many mathematical axioms are based upon recursive rules. For example, the formal definition of the natural numbers by the Peano axioms can be described as: "Zero is a natural number, and each natural number has a successor, which is also a natural number." By this base case and recursive rule, one can generate the set of all natural numbers.

Other recursively defined mathematical objects include factorials, functions (e.g., recurrence relations), sets (e.g., Cantor ternary set), and fractals.

There are various more tongue-in-cheek definitions of recursion; see recursive humor.

== Informal definition ==
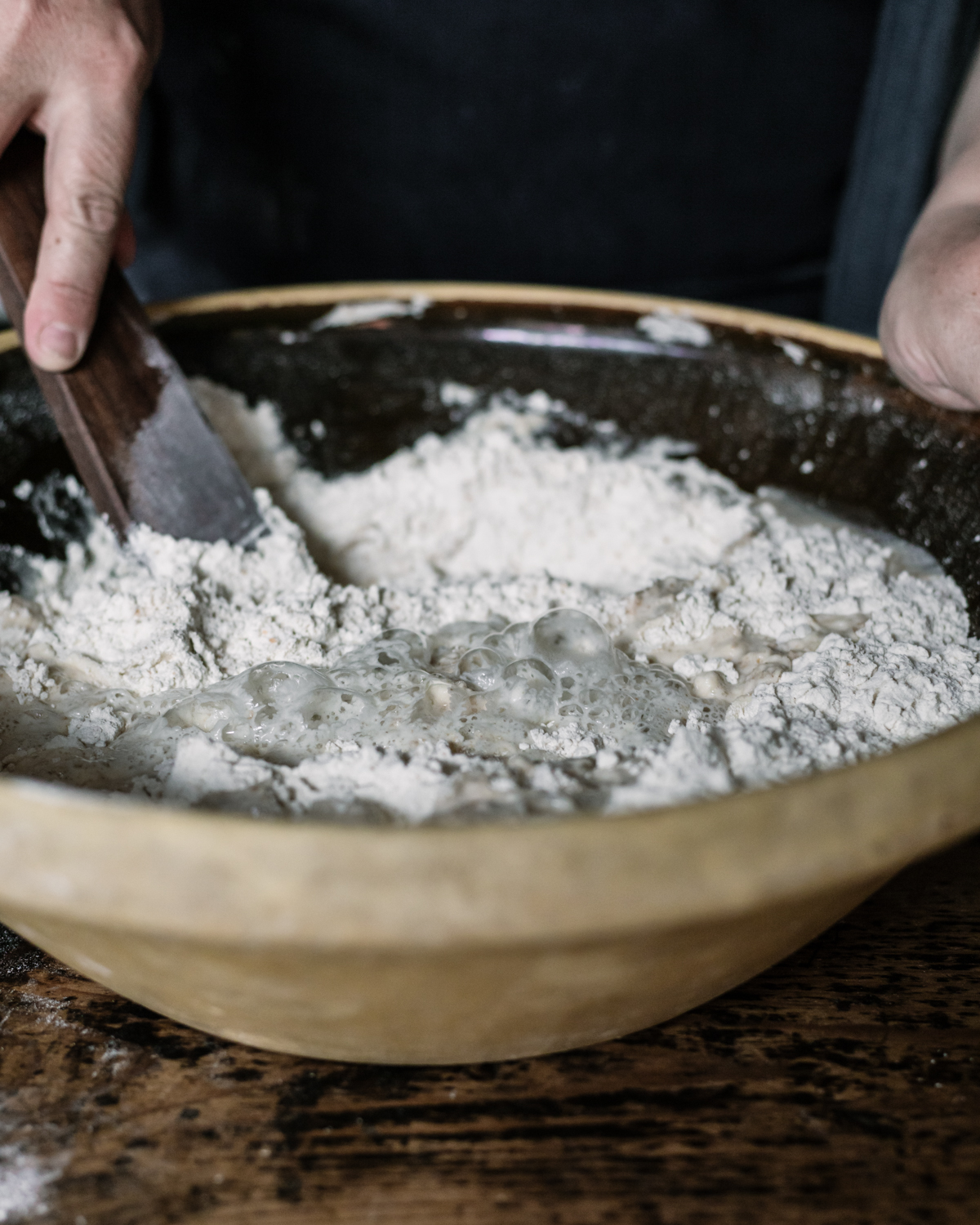
Sourdough starter being stirred into flour to produce sourdough: the recipe calls for some sourdough left over from the last time the same recipe was made.

Recursion is the process a procedure goes through when one of the steps of the procedure involves invoking the procedure itself. A procedure that goes through recursion is said to be 'recursive'.

To understand recursion, one must recognize the distinction between a procedure and the running of a procedure. A procedure is a set of steps based on a set of rules, while the running of a procedure involves actually following the rules and performing the steps.

Recursion is related to, but not the same as, a reference within the specification of a procedure to the execution of some other procedure.

When a procedure is thus defined, this immediately creates the possibility of an endless loop; recursion can only be properly used in a definition if the step in question is skipped in certain cases so that the procedure can complete.

Even if it is properly defined, a recursive procedure is not easy for humans to perform, as it requires distinguishing the new from the old, partially executed invocation of the procedure; this requires some administration as to how far various simultaneous instances of the procedures have progressed. For this reason, recursive definitions are very rare in everyday situations.

== In language ==
Linguist Noam Chomsky, among many others, has argued that the lack of an upper bound on the number of grammatical sentences in a language, and the lack of an upper bound on grammatical sentence length (beyond practical constraints such as the time available to utter one), can be explained as the consequence of recursion in natural language.

There are many structures apart from sentences that can be defined recursively, and therefore many ways in which a sentence can embed instances of one category inside another. Over the years, languages in general have proved amenable to this kind of analysis.

The generally accepted idea that recursion is an essential property of human language has been challenged by Daniel Everett on the basis of his claims about the Pirahã language. Andrew Nevins, David Pesetsky and Cilene Rodrigues are among many who have argued against this. Literary self-reference can in any case be argued to be different in kind from mathematical or logical recursion.

Recursion plays a crucial role not only in syntax, but also in natural language semantics. The word and, for example, can be construed as a function that can apply to sentence meanings to create new sentences, and likewise for noun phrase meanings, verb phrase meanings, and others. It can also apply to intransitive verbs, transitive verbs, or ditransitive verbs. In order to provide a single denotation for it that is suitably flexible, and is typically defined so that it can take any of these different types of meanings as arguments. This can be done by defining it for a simple case in which it combines sentences, and then defining the other cases recursively in terms of the simple one.

A recursive grammar is a formal grammar that contains recursive production rules.

=== Recursive humor ===
Recursion is sometimes used humorously in computer science, programming, philosophy, or mathematics textbooks, generally by giving a circular definition or self-reference, in which the putative recursive step does not get closer to a base case, but instead leads to an infinite regress. It is not unusual for such books to include a joke entry in their glossary along the lines of:

Recursion, see Recursion.

A variation is found on page 269 in the index of some editions of Brian Kernighan and Dennis Ritchie's book The C Programming Language; the index entry recursively refers to itself ("recursion 86, 139, 141, 182, 202, 269"). Early versions of this joke can be found in Let's talk Lisp by Laurent Siklóssy (published by Prentice Hall PTR on December 1, 1975, with a copyright date of 1976) and in Software Tools by Kernighan and Plauger (published by Addison-Wesley Professional on January 11, 1976). The joke also appears in The UNIX Programming Environment by Kernighan and Pike. It did not appear in the first edition of The C Programming Language. The joke is part of the functional programming folklore and was already widespread in the functional programming community before the publication of the aforementioned books.

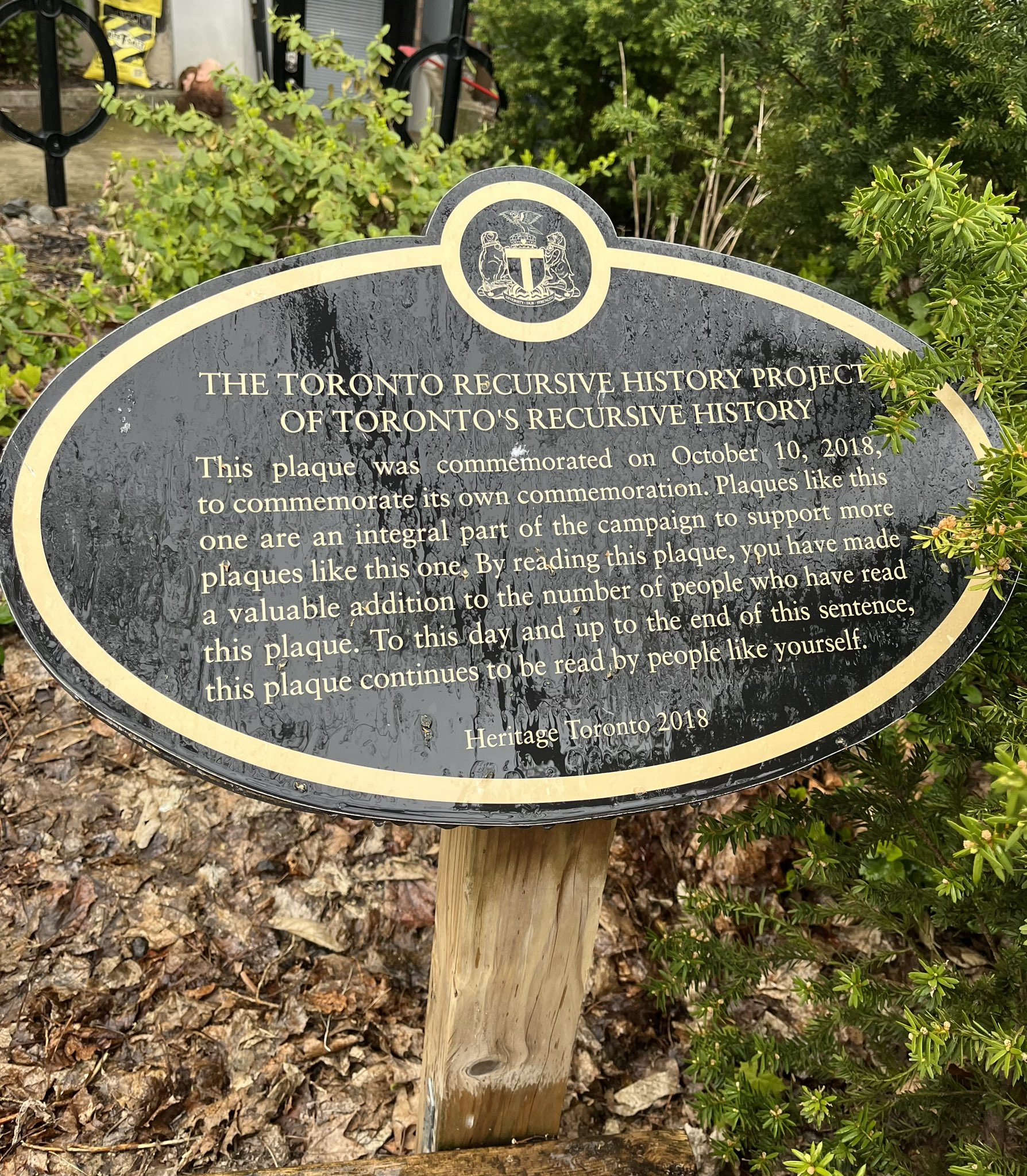
A plaque commemorates the Toronto Recursive History Project of Toronto's Recursive History.

Another joke is that "To understand recursion, you must understand recursion." In the English-language version of the Google web search engine, when a search for "recursion" is made, the site suggests "Did you mean: recursion." An alternative form is the following, from Andrew Plotkin: "If you already know what recursion is, just remember the answer. Otherwise, find someone who is standing closer to Douglas Hofstadter than you are; then ask him or her what recursion is."

Recursive acronyms are other examples of recursive humor. PHP, for example, stands for "PHP Hypertext Preprocessor", WINE stands for "WINE Is Not an Emulator", RPM stands for "RPM Package manager", GNU stands for "GNU's not Unix", and SPARQL denotes the "SPARQL Protocol and RDF Query Language".

== In mathematics ==
The Sierpiński triangle—a confined recursion of triangles that form a fractal

=== Recursively defined sets ===
==== Example: the natural numbers ====
The canonical example of a recursively defined set is given by the natural numbers:

0 is in $\mathbb{N}$
if n is in $\mathbb{N}$, then n + 1 is in $\mathbb{N}$
The set of natural numbers is the smallest set satisfying the previous two properties.

In mathematical logic, the Peano axioms (or Peano postulates or Dedekind–Peano axioms), are axioms for the natural numbers presented in the 19th century by the German mathematician Richard Dedekind and by the Italian mathematician Giuseppe Peano. The Peano Axioms define the natural numbers referring to a recursive successor function and addition and multiplication as recursive functions.

==== Example: Proof procedure ====
Another interesting example is the set of all "provable" propositions in an axiomatic system that are defined in terms of a proof procedure which is inductively (or recursively) defined as follows:

- If a proposition is an axiom, it is a provable proposition.
- If a proposition can be derived from true reachable propositions by means of inference rules, it is a provable proposition.
- The set of provable propositions is the smallest set of propositions satisfying these conditions.

=== Finite subdivision rules ===
Finite subdivision rules are a geometric form of recursion, which can be used to create fractal-like images. A subdivision rule starts with a collection of polygons labelled by finitely many labels, and then each polygon is subdivided into smaller labelled polygons in a way that depends only on the labels of the original polygon. This process can be iterated. The standard 'middle thirds' technique for creating the Cantor set is a subdivision rule, as is barycentric subdivision.

=== Functional recursion ===
A function may be recursively defined in terms of itself. A familiar example is the Fibonacci number sequence: F(n) = F(n − 1) + F(n − 2). For such a definition to be useful, it must be reducible to non-recursively defined values: in this case F(0) = 0 and F(1) = 1.

=== Proofs involving recursive definitions ===
Applying the standard technique of proof by cases to recursively defined sets or functions, as in the preceding sections, yields structural induction — a powerful generalization of mathematical induction widely used to derive proofs in mathematical logic and computer science.

=== Recursive optimization ===
Dynamic programming is an approach to optimization that restates a multiperiod or multistep optimization problem in recursive form. The key result in dynamic programming is the Bellman equation, which writes the value of the optimization problem at an earlier time (or earlier step) in terms of its value at a later time (or later step).

=== The recursion theorem ===
In set theory, this is a theorem guaranteeing that recursively defined functions exist. Given a set X, an element a of X and a function f: X → X, the theorem states that there is a unique function $F: \N \to X$ (where $\N$ denotes the set of natural numbers including zero) such that

$$F(0) = a$$
$$F(n + 1) = f(F(n))$$

for any natural number n.

Dedekind was the first to pose the problem of unique definition of set-theoretical functions on $\mathbb N$ by recursion, and gave a sketch of an argument in the 1888 essay "Was sind und was sollen die Zahlen?"

==== Proof of existence ====
Let $S = \{ A \subseteq {\mathbb{N}} \times X:(0,a) \in A\text{ and if }(x,y) \in A\text{ then }(x + 1,f(y)) \in A\}$.

S is not empty since ${\mathbb{N}} \times X \in S$. Let $g=\bigcap_{A \in S}A$. Now $(0,a) \in g$ since it is in all $A \in S$. Moreover, if $(x,y) \in g$ then $(x,y) \in A$ for all $A \in S$. But then $(x+1,f(y)) \in A$ for all $A \in S$ so that $(x+1,f(y)) \in g$. Therefore $g \in S$ and it is the smallest element of S.

Let $T = \{ n \in {\mathbb{N}}:\exists z \in X\text{ such that }(n,z) \in g\}$. Now $0 \in T$ since $(0,a) \in g$. Suppose $n \in T$. Then $(n,z) \in g$ for some $z \in X$. This gives $(n+1,f(z)) \in g$. Hence $n+1 \in T$. It follows by mathematical induction that $T={\mathbb{N}}$.

Let $U=\{x \in {\mathbb{N}}:\text{if }(x,y),(x,z) \in g \text{ then } y=z \}$. Suppose for contradiction that $0 \notin U$. That is, suppose we have $(0,z)$, in addition, $(0,a) \in g$, where $z \neq a$. Then $g \backslash \{(0,z)\} \in S$, contradicting the fact that g is the smallest element of S. Thus, $0 \in U$.

We show that if $x \in U$ then $x+1 \in U$. Suppose this is not the case. Then $\exists m \in U$ so that $m+1 \notin U$. Since $m \in U$ and $T={\mathbb{N}}$, there is a unique $n \in \mathbb{N}$ with $(m,n) \in g$. Then $(m+1,f(n)) \in g$. Since $m+1 \notin U$, there is an $(m+1,z) \in g$, in addition to $(m+1,f(n)) \in g$, where $z \neq f(n)$. But then $g \backslash \{(m+1,z)\} \in S$, contradicting the fact that g is the smallest element of S. The mathematical induction then says that $U={\mathbb{N}}$. Therefore there exists a function whose graph is g. Denote it by F.

==== Proof of uniqueness ====
Take two functions $F: \N \to X$ and $G: \N \to X$ such that:

$$F(0) = a$$
$$G(0) = a$$
$$F(n + 1) = f(F(n))$$
$$G(n + 1) = f(G(n))$$

where a is an element of X.

It can be proved by mathematical induction that F(n) = G(n) for all natural numbers n:

Base Case: F(0) = a = G(0) so the equality holds for n = 0.

Inductive Step: Suppose F(k) = G(k) for some $k \in \N$. Then F(k + 1) = f(F(k)) = f(G(k)) = G(k + 1).

Hence F(k) = G(k) implies F(k + 1) = G(k + 1).

By induction, F(n) = G(n) for all $n \in \N$.

== In computer science ==
A common method of simplification is to divide a problem into subproblems of the same type. As a computer programming technique, this is called divide and conquer and is key to the design of many important algorithms. Divide and conquer serves as a top-down approach to problem solving, where problems are solved by solving smaller and smaller instances. A contrary approach is dynamic programming. This approach serves as a bottom-up approach, where problems are solved by solving larger and larger instances, until the desired size is reached.

A classic example of recursion is the definition of the factorial function, given here in Python code:

def factorial(n):
    if n > 0:
        return n * factorial(n - 1)
    else:
        return 1

The function calls itself recursively on a smaller version of the input (n - 1) and multiplies the result of the recursive call by n, until reaching the base case, analogously to the mathematical definition of factorial.

Recursion in computer programming is exemplified when a function is defined in terms of simpler, often smaller versions of itself. The solution to the problem is then devised by combining the solutions obtained from the simpler versions of the problem. One example application of recursion is in parsers for programming languages. The great advantage of recursion is that an infinite set of possible sentences, designs or other data can be defined, parsed or produced by a finite computer program.

Recurrence relations are equations which define one or more sequences recursively. Some specific kinds of recurrence relation can be "solved" to obtain a non-recursive definition (e.g., a closed-form expression).

Use of recursion in an algorithm has both advantages and disadvantages. The main advantage is usually the simplicity of instructions. The main disadvantage is that the memory usage of recursive algorithms may grow very quickly, rendering them impractical for larger instances.

== In biology ==
Shapes that seem to have been created by recursive processes sometimes appear in plants and animals, such as in branching structures in which one large part branches out into two or more similar smaller parts. One example is Romanesco broccoli.

== In business ==
Recursion is sometimes referred to in management science as the process of iterating through levels of abstraction in large business entities. A common example is the recursive nature of management hierarchies, ranging from line management to senior management via middle management. It also encompasses the larger issue of capital structure in corporate governance.

== In art ==
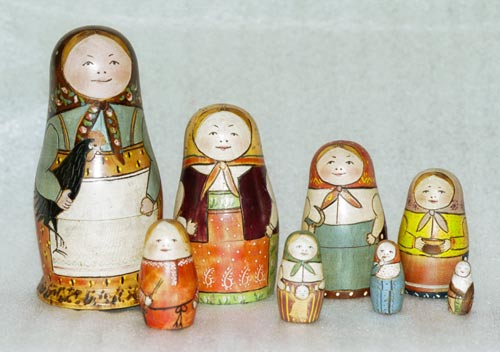
Recursive dolls: the original set of Matryoshka dolls by Zvyozdochkin and Malyutin, 1892

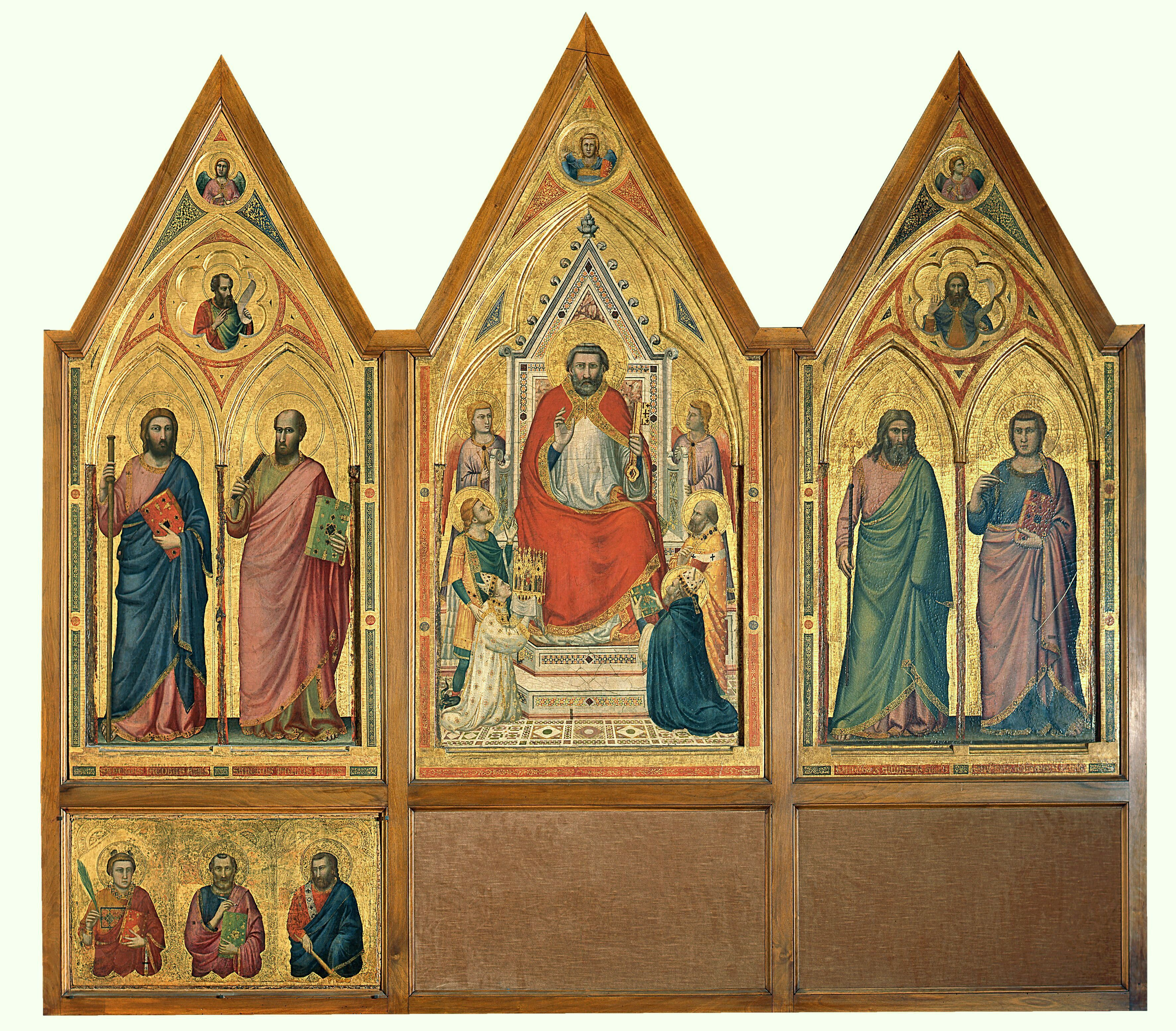
Front face of Giotto's Stefaneschi Triptych, 1320, recursively contains an image of itself (held up by the kneeling figure in the central panel).

The Matryoshka doll is a physical artistic example of the recursive concept.

Recursion has been used in paintings since Giotto's Stefaneschi Triptych, made in 1320. Its central panel contains the kneeling figure of Cardinal Stefaneschi, holding up the triptych itself as an offering. This practice is more generally known as the Droste effect, an example of the Mise en abyme technique.

M. C. Escher's Print Gallery (1956) is a print which depicts a distorted city containing a gallery which recursively contains the picture, and so ad infinitum.

== In culture ==
The film Inception has colloquialized the appending of the suffix -ception to a noun to jokingly indicate the recursion of something.

== See also ==
- Corecursion – Type of algorithm in computer science
- Course-of-values recursion – Technique for defining number-theoretic functions by recursion
- Digital infinity – Term in theoretical linguistics
- A Dream Within a Dream (poem) – Poem by Edgar Allan Poe
- Droste effect – Recursive visual effect
- False awakening – Vivid and convincing dream about awakening from sleep
- Fixed point combinator – Higher-order function which returns some fixed point of the input function
- Infinite compositions of analytic functions – Mathematical theory about infinitely iterated function composition
- Infinite loop – Programming idiom
- Infinite regress – Philosophical problem
- Infinitism – Philosophical view that knowledge may be justified by an infinite chain of reasons
- Infinity mirror – Parallel or angled mirrors reflecting each other
- Iterated function – Result of repeatedly applying a mathematical function
- Mathematical induction – Form of mathematical proof
- Mise en abyme – Technique of placing a copy of an image within itself, or a story within a story
- Reentrant (subroutine) – Concept in computer programming
- Self-reference – Sentence, idea or formula that refers to itself
- Schröder–Bernstein property – Mathematical property
- Spiegel im Spiegel – 1978 musical composition by Arvo Pärt
- Strange loop – Cycles going through a hierarchy
- Tail recursion – Subroutine call performed as final action of a procedure
- Tupper's self-referential formula – Formula that visually represents itself when graphed
- Turtles all the way down – Statement of infinite regress

== Bibliography ==
- Dijkstra, Edsger W. (1960). "Recursive Programming". Numerische Mathematik. 2 (1): 312–318. doi:10.1007/BF01386232. S2CID 127891023.
- Johnsonbaugh, Richard (2004). Discrete Mathematics. Prentice Hall. ISBN 978-0-13-117686-7.
- Hofstadter, Douglas (1999). Gödel, Escher, Bach: an Eternal Golden Braid. Basic Books. ISBN 978-0-465-02656-2.
- Shoenfield, Joseph R. (2000). Recursion Theory. A K Peters Ltd. ISBN 978-1-56881-149-9.
- Causey, Robert L. (2001). Logic, Sets, and Recursion. Jones & Bartlett. ISBN 978-0-7637-1695-0.
- Cori, Rene; Lascar, Daniel; Pelletier, Donald H. (2001). Recursion Theory, Gödel's Theorems, Set Theory, Model Theory. Oxford University Press. ISBN 978-0-19-850050-6.
- Barwise, Jon; Moss, Lawrence S. (1996). Vicious Circles. Stanford Univ Center for the Study of Language and Information. ISBN 978-0-19-850050-6. - offers a treatment of corecursion.
- Rosen, Kenneth H. (2002). Discrete Mathematics and Its Applications. McGraw-Hill College. ISBN 978-0-07-293033-7.
- Cormen, Thomas H.; Leiserson, Charles E.; Rivest, Ronald L.; Stein, Clifford (2001). Introduction to Algorithms. Mit Pr. ISBN 978-0-262-03293-3.
- Kernighan, B.; Ritchie, D. (1988). The C programming Language. Prentice Hall. ISBN 978-0-13-110362-7.
- Stokey, Nancy; Robert Lucas; Edward Prescott (1989). Recursive Methods in Economic Dynamics. Harvard University Press. ISBN 978-0-674-75096-8.
- Hungerford (1980). Algebra. Springer. ISBN 978-0-387-90518-1., first chapter on set theory.
