= Matron (disambiguation) =

Matron may refer to:

- Matron (nurse), title for a female senior nurse
- Matron (boarding school), also called housemistress, is a work title of a staff member responsible for the pastoral care and domestic management of boarders (boarding school pupils)
- A wife
- A mother
- A female prison officer
- Matrona, a type of Celtic mother goddess
- Matron of Pitane (fl. c. 400 BC), an Ancient Greek poet and parodist
- Horseraces for mares:
  - Matron Stakes (disambiguation)
  - California Cup Matron

== See also ==
- Matron literature, a literary genre which focuses on older female characters as protagonists
- Matron of honor, a married senior bridesmaid
- Matron's badge, a gentlewoman's headdress worn in the Scottish Highlands in former times
- Matron Head, 1816–1839 design of the Coronet large cent issued by the United States Mint
- College of Matrons, a residential building and charity within the Salisbury Cathedral Close, Wiltshire, England
- Jury of matrons, convened to establish whether a party to a legal action was pregnant
- Temple matron, female leadership position in the Church of Jesus Christ of Latter-day Saints
- Matriarchy, a social system in which positions of dominance and privilege are held by women
- Matronymic, a personal or parental name based on the given name of a female ancestor
- Matrona (disambiguation)
