= Portrait of D. A. Furmanov =

1922 portrait by Sergey Malyutin

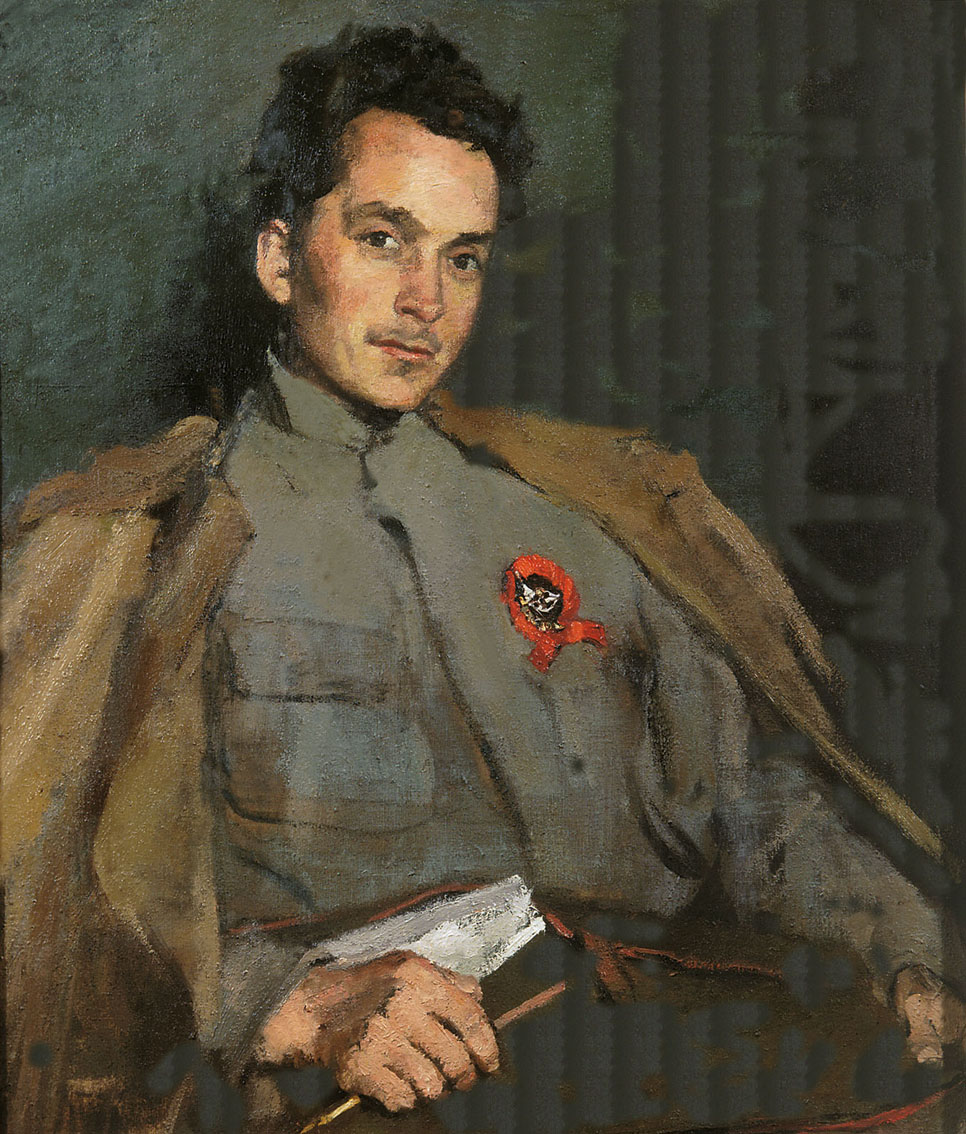
- Artist: Sergey Malyutin
- Year: 1922
- Medium: Oil on canvas
- Dimensions: 82 cm × 74 cm (32 in × 29 in)
- Location: Tretyakov State Gallery; Moscow

Portrait of D. A. Furmanov is a painting by the Russian and Soviet artist Sergey Malyutin, created in 1922. It is part of the collection of the State Tretyakov Gallery. The painting depicts a prominent participant in the Civil War and Soviet writer Dmitry Andreyevich Furmanov. The portrait is the most famous work of the artist, and one of the finest examples of Soviet portrait painting. Art historian and author of a monograph on the artist's work, I. Ilyushin, called the painting a "true triumph of portrait art", noting that a Soviet person cannot imagine the writer differently from how the artist depicted him on this canvas. According to Doctor of Art History Dmitry Sarabyanov, the artist managed to capture in the portrait the image of a new homo sovieticus (Note: An overview of different points of view on this term contains an article by Klaus Gestva, PhD, professor at the University of Tübingen — Gestva K. Homo Sovieticus. The history of one collective concept // Vestnik obshchestvennyi obchestvennyi obrazovanie: Journal. 2018. 1-6 (№ 1-2 (126)). pp. 58-79.) — an intellectual and humanist, who became the heir to all the progressive elements of pre-revolutionary Russia's cultural heritage.

Candidate of Art History Kira Sazonova considered the Portrait of D. A. Furmanov unusual in its painterly-plastic structure and the poetic means employed by the artist. On one hand, it is quite traditional (created in continuation of the realist traditions of pre-revolutionary Russia). On the other hand, the portrait was not only a product of a new era but also laid the foundation for a new art. Candidate of Art History Valentina Knyazeva believed that Malyutin's painting established the foundations for the future method of socialist realism, as it conveys both the individual essence of the subject and the typical traits of a person of his time.

== Creation and history ==
Throughout his life, Malyutin created over 300 pastel and oil portraits, yet, according to Dmitry Sarabyanov, portraiture for him was not only an opportunity to showcase his skill. His subjects were not just acquaintances or close associates but prominent figures in Russian culture. Sergey Malyutin immediately embraced the October Revolution, referring to the Bolsheviks as "bearers of truth and happiness". In 1922, he joined the Association of Artists of Revolutionary Russia (AKhRR), effectively being one of its founders, with the first meetings of the association held at the artist's apartment. In the late 1910s and 1920s, Malyutin created an entire gallery of portraits of people of the new era, including artists, writers, scientists, doctors, engineers, and later workers and soldiers of the Red Army.

In the catalog of a solo exhibition of S. V. Malyutin's works held in Moscow in 1934, the painting is listed under the title Portrait of D. A. Furmanov, with 1920 indicated as the year of creation. Doctor of Philological Sciences Alexander Berezhnoi, in his book Furmanov the Journalist, published in 1955, dated the portrait to 1921. Currently, art historians at the Tretyakov Gallery date it to 1922.

=== D. A. Furmanov in the early 1920s ===
By the spring of 1921, Furmanov was working as the head of the political department of the 9th Army of the Workers' and Peasants' Red Army. After the restoration of Soviet power in Georgia, he was appointed to the 11th Army as editor of the newspaper Krasniy Voin. In June 1921, Furmanov moved to Moscow, where he began working first in the literary department of the Revolutionary Military Council, and later in the Higher Military Editorial Council, where he served as head of the periodical literature section (A. Kalnberzina also mentions his work at the journal Military Thought and Revolution). In August of the same year, he was demobilized. Initially, after arriving in the capital, Furmanov faced significant financial difficulties. He was forced to write a large number of articles and reviews, while, in his own words, cursing the royalty. To navigate the complex and turbulent literary scene of the time, Furmanov attended debates, theater performances, and poetry readings at the Polytechnic Museum, the All-Russian Union of Poets, the House of the Press, and cafés of the imagism artists. In October 1921, Furmanov was enrolled as a second-year student in the Faculty of Social Sciences at Moscow State University. In September 1923, he began working at State Publishing House as an editor of contemporary fiction, and in June 1924, he also took on a role as a reviewer at the Institute of Party History. In 1922, Dmitry Furmanov was 31 years old, but in the portrait, he appears younger.

Soviet critic, editor, journalist, and historian Vyacheslav Polonsky wrote about his meetings with Furmanov in the early 1920s:

"He was a young, lean man of average height, slender, with a handsome face… His eyes made a strong impression on me. Large, they seemed black and wide open. His gaze did not glide but lingered for a long time… It seemed that in the dark depths of those attentive eyes burned an invisible but intense fire… Always reserved, he appeared secretive, withdrawn, as if constantly pondering something alone, not sharing his inner work with anyone. He rarely smiled, but when he did, his white, strong teeth lit up his face, making it boyish and spirited…"

In January 1922, in Furmanov's diary appeared in the first entry about the idea of the novel Chapaev. Many months passed in thinking about the future of the novel. In the fall, direct work on the book began. From October to December, Furmanov worked on the novel day and night. During this time and the book was created.

=== Portrait's dating and circumstances ===
According to art historian Alina Abramova, Furmanov was brought to Sergey Malyutin by the Russian Soviet peasant poet and artist, the last chairman of the Peredvizhniki Society and the first chairman of the Association of Artists of Revolutionary Russia, P. A. Radimov. The artist's studio was then located on the eighth floor of one of several buildings at house 21 on Myasnitskaya Street. In his memoir About the Dear and Familiar, Pavel Radimov himself mentioned this episode, noting that he persuaded Furmanov to pose for an unspecified exhibition. Radimov recalled that "Furmanov posed with great embarrassment, was very shy, and blushed like a village girl".

External images
- | D. A. Furmanov
- | D. A. Furmanov with his wife Anna Steshko

Doctor of Art History and senior researcher at the Research Institute of the Academy of Arts of the USSR Leonid Zinger wrote with surprise that he could find no mention of the artist's work on the writer's portrait in either Malyutin's manuscripts or Furmanov's diary entries. Furmanov mentioned the artist's name only once, much later— in the winter of 1923, in a diary entry about visiting the studio of engraver V. D. Falileev. Furmanov wrote that it was as uncomfortable and cold there as in Malyutin's studio. For this reason, Zinger considered the account recorded by him from Sergey Malyutin's daughter, Olga Malyutina dedicated to this event (recorded on July 30, 1968), to be extremely valuable. According to her, Malyutin painted Furmanov's portrait in winter— either at the beginning or end of 1922. Malyutin's unheated studio was very cold, so Furmanov had to drape a greatcoat over his shoulders. In Zinger's view, the beginning of the year can be ruled out, as Furmanov is depicted in the painting wearing an order. The Order of the Red Banner was awarded to him no earlier than the spring of 1922, by order of the Revolutionary Military Council of the Republic on March 29, 1922. (Note: In August 1920, Wrangel's General Sergei Ulagai unexpectedly landed with Cossack units on the Azov coast and began moving along the Kuban River toward Krasnodar. The landing group, whose commissar was appointed Dmitry Furmanov, was to secretly advance along the Protoke and Kuban rivers to Ulagai's headquarters, defeat it and cut off the White Guards' retreat. The outstanding participants of the landing were honored with high government awards.) According to Leonid Zinger, there were five posing sessions. One more —the final one— was planned. The artist intended to refine the hands of the subject and go over the portrait for the last time. Furmanov, however, was preoccupied with writing his novel, so the final session never took place. Sergey Malyutin was forced to complete the portrait from memory. Leonid Zinger suggested that it was during the work on the novel Chapaev at the end of 1922 that the writer posed for Sergey Malyutin.

Art historian Alina Abramova, citing the same memoirs of the artist's daughter, recounts this episode differently in her monograph on the artist. Malyutin reportedly expected two more sessions to finish painting the writer's hands. However, Furmanov got ill and then went on a business trip in the summer of 1922. His phone numbers changed after the trip. In the fall, he worked almost non-stop on Chapaev. The artist's work on the portrait was never resumed. Malyutin hoped to continue the sessions and, considering the portrait unfinished, did not submit it to the AKhRR exhibition in 1922. It was only presented at the AKhRR exhibition the following year. The portrait became one of the central events of that exhibition.

Abramova dated the portrait to the spring of 1922. She discovered an entry in the artist's expense book (preserving the original orthography and punctuation): "August 1922, 2nd — Wednesday. Note: 30 received from Kotov N. G. (according to him) advance payment of 150,000,000 from 'V. A. Kh. R. R.' From this amount, contributions were made: Membership 4 m. 2% to the secretariat 3 m. Total 7,000,000. This, for now? is the first payment, and to date I have completed: painted the portrait of Lazarevich, started the portrait of Furmanov. Trip to T. province. A second trip to Dmitrov Mosc. province is planned." She considered this entry proof that the painting was created before August 1922. The daily ration for Malyutin's family at that time was 13,000,000 rubles.

Another version was advocated by Candidate of Historical Sciences Dmitry Shelestov. In the summer of 1922, Moscow hosted the AKhRR exhibition Everyday Life of the Red Army, which was a great success (it was the second exhibition of the Association). It was decided to hold another exhibition on the same theme the following year to mark the 5th anniversary of the Red Army (the fourth Association exhibition was later named Red Army). Artists received commissions for paintings. (Note: On the contrary, Valentina Knyazeva, in her monograph on the activities of the AKhRR, claims that the exhibition committee, through the newspaper Izvestia, appealed to all artists of the USSR to participate in the exhibition, regardless of their membership in art associations.) Sergey Malyutin was assigned the portrait of Dmitry Furmanov, who had recently received the Order of the Red Banner for personal heroism. Shelestov, like Zinger, dated the creation of the portrait to October–December of that year.

The posing sessions, according to O. S. Malyutina's recollections, took place "in lively conversations that gave my father great pleasure, as Furmanov was a remarkable conversationalist". She recalled that while posing, the writer shared episodes from his military biography with the artist, in particular about the Red Landing of 1920. Furmanov wrote next to a photograph of Malyutin's portrait in an album, which, according to Zinger, is held by the writer's heirs: "Furmanov Dmitry Andreyevich. Head of the Political Department of the Turkestan Front and commissar of the Red Landing that went behind enemy lines in the fall of 1920". However, according to Alina Abramova in her two monographs on the artist, Furmanov made this inscription in Malyutin's album. According to Abramova, Malyutin saw in Furmanov a person of great intelligence and heart. He expressed a desire to create illustrations for Chapaev once the book was completed, showed Furmanov books he had illustrated, and wrote down the writer's work and home phone numbers on the cover of one of them (The Little Town).

=== In the collection of the State Tretyakov Gallery ===
The painting is a part of the State Tretyakov Gallery collection (inventory number 27794). During Soviet times, it was exposed in the museum's permanent exhibition in Hall No. 36. The technique of the work is oil painting on canvas. Its dimensions are 82 by 74 centimeters (a 1987 catalog lists different dimensions — 82 by 71 centimeters). The portrait is signed and dated 1922 by the artist himself. The catalog of the Exhibition of Works by S. V. Malyutin in Moscow in 1934 stated that the painting was already the property of the State Tretyakov Gallery by 1934. However, the book State Tretyakov Gallery. History and Collections and the 2017 Tretyakov Gallery catalog claim that the painting entered the Tretyakov Gallery in 1948 from the Central House of the Red Army named after M. V. Frunze.

The painting has been exhibited multiple times. Among these exhibitions are: the IV AKhRR Exhibition in 1923 in Moscow (where the painting was displayed under the title Portrait of the Former Commissar of the Red Landing in Kuban, D. A. Furmanov), the VI AKhRR Exhibition in Moscow titled Revolution, Everyday Life, and Labor in 1925 (under the title Portrait of Comrade Furmanov, Head of the Political Department of the Turkestan Front), and the solo exhibition of Sergey Malyutin held in Moscow in 1934.

== Author's interpretation of the portrait ==
Furmanov is represented in the portrait as a literary worker — with a briefcase, pencil and paper. According to Galina Golynets, a candidate of art history, the portrait's character combines the two main themes of this period of Malyutin's work — the image of a man of the new age and a man of art. Doctor of art history Mikhail Lebedyansky wrote that the portrait lacks the slightest hint of model posing or external effects. On the contrary, Galina Golynets claimed that the artist did not hide the fact that his model was posing. In her opinion, this can be felt in the comfortable and at the same time expressive position of Furmanov's body. The artistic merits of the picture were highly appreciated by Leonid Zinger. In addition to the biographical peculiarities of the portrait, Zinger also emphasized the historical ones — the correspondence of the subject world of the portrait with the realities of the early 1920s. Sergey Malyutin admired Furmanov, (Note: A different point of view was expressed in the article by Andrei Puchkov, a doctor of art history. Comparing the portrait of Malyutin with the portrait of Kornei Chukovsky painted by Ilya Repin in 1910, he suggested that Malyutin was ironizing his hero ("ironic attitude of the artist to the character who wrote worker-heroic agitations").) and said about him: "A soft, sensitive soul". In Zinger's opinion, the artist also suspected such qualities in him, which, thanks to the writer's ability to control himself, eluded even Furmanov's closest friends. Zinger noted that Malyutin was able to "recognize a complex character in continuous development and improvement, to guess the truly dominant features in him".

=== Writer's representation ===
Furmanov's outward appearance in Malyutin's portrait closely aligns with biographical descriptions by his contemporaries. They noted his lean figure, handsome intelligent face with a mass of curly hair, high forehead, large dark lively and perceptive eyes, and finely outlined mouth. Several photographs of Dmitry Furmanov from the 1920s are known. Zinger pointed out their dissimilarity to Malyutin's portrait. At the same time, according to the art historian, people who knew Furmanov and saw the portrait recognized its striking resemblance to the original.

The writer is dressed in a Red Army tunic, with the combat Order of the Red Banner on his chest and a greatcoat draped over his shoulders. The portrait evokes memories of Furmanov the commissar, a hero of the Civil War. The artist depicts not a soldier but a writer, student, and public figure who, while retaining certain traits of a warrior, has already transitioned to civilian life. The writer is positioned before the artist in a relaxed and remarkably "peaceful" pose. His half-length figure leans slightly back, with his shoulders even touching the drapery of the background. The writer's head is tilted toward his shoulder, and his hands are relaxed.

Zinger suggested that the artist noticed signs of Furmanov's physical problems (which the writer himself mentioned in his diary at the time). According to Zinger, these signs are reflected in the writer's face (Malyutin "discerned a hint of barely perceptible fatigue in his clear, smiling, responsive gaze, and an unusually vivid flush on his swarthy cheeks"). Galina Golynets argued that Malyutin convincingly depicted the writer's serious illness through his sadness, physical exhaustion, and readiness to continue working despite difficulties. She believed that the poem Conversation with Dmitry Furmanov by S. A. Kirsanov, written in 1928 after the writer's death, was "anticipated and inspired" by Malyutin's painting.

The writer's image exudes inner strength, but this strength is expressed "quietly, with restraint". This reserved modesty was characteristic of Furmanov himself. Malyutin managed to reveal all the underlying forces of the writer's complex nature, which combined unyielding will and warmth of soul, intransigence and heartfelt kindness, mathematically precise pragmatism and almost childlike spontaneity, sober intellect and passionate emotionality. Zinger particularly highlighted the eyes of Malyutin's subject. Their soft, velvety glow radiates "inquisitive thought, as if concentrating all the finest qualities of the portrayed, which together form one all-encompassing trait — humanity". Humanity, according to Zinger, is the dominant feature in the portrait of Dmitry Furmanov. Thus, the composition of the canvas used by the artist is simple, natural, and calm. Zinger believed that Malyutin's approach to his subject echoes the artistic manner of Furmanov himself. The easel form of Malyutin's portrait is akin to the painterly structure of the psychological images created by Ilya Repin, Valentin Serov, and Nikolai Yaroshenko. For Zinger, Furmanov shared many traits with the best representatives of the Russian democratic intelligentsia of the late 19th and early 20th centuries, as captured by these artists.

Leonid Zinger saw the innovation of Furmanov's portrait not only in its form, but also in the image characterization. The novelty lay in the very archetype — a person formed by the revolution. Zinger also identified the artist's innovation in the pose, gestures, facial expression of the subject, and depiction of his attire. Malyutin demonstrated:

"Great resourcefulness, inventiveness, and tact to reveal, generalize, and typify the main, essential elements. The portrait convinces us with its absolute likeness, striking with the vitality of its subject, composition, and colors. With closer inspection, we discover in its details a lot of conventional painting's ways, which create a truly realistic, rather than illusory, image".

Malyutin discarded the insignificant details and emphasized the details which served to reveal the character of the subject: the eyes (Sarabyanov noted an inner fire in the "searing" gaze of the eyes, "ready to burst forth at any moment"), forehead, and mouth. This created an irresistible impression of the subject's inner strength, integrity, and beauty. According to a contemporary's recollection, Furmanov's eyes and hair were not as black, nor his face as swarthy, nor the flush on his cheeks as vivid. The khaki tunic could not have been so gray, nor the greatcoat so ochre. The portrait's background, consisting of dark green (on the left) and dark brown (on the right) draperies, does not correspond to the interior in which the writer's creative work took place.

Valentina Knyazeva noted that the artist depicted Furmanov in deep contemplation. The masculine, youthful face reflects a "bright dream" and "romanticism", with serious eyes shining with kindness and nobility.

=== Composition ===
Art historian Elena Petinova considered the composition of the portrait to be characteristic for the artist's work. In her opinion, this composition gives dynamism to the model's outwardly static position. The figure of the writer is placed on the diagonal of the almost square canvas, which creates "internal mobility of the picture". Malyutin used both graphic and painterly means to achieve his goal. Intentionally clearly drawn lines of clothing converge on the face, and the volumetrically shaped head stands out on the "flattened" written figure of Furmanov.

The composition of the portrait introduces the viewer to the atmosphere of unhurried creative reflection. The clear and calm rhythm of the canvas is created by the subtle movements of the writer's body and head, the soft gesture of his hands resting on the briefcase. Furmanov's figure is depicted in a three-quarter turn and shifted to the left side of the canvas. The linear rhythm is defined by the soft diagonals of the shoulders, arm, head and eye axis. They point in the opposite direction to the tilt of the head. This gives the picture a restrained dynamism and reinforces the sense of the writer's concentration and lively interest. Zinger noticed a similar technique in the portraits of Ilya Repin. He also emphasized the circular movement of the lines (from the axis of the eyes, through the diagonals of the hand, briefcase, shoulder, back to the eyes), which gives the composition "balance, isolation, quite in keeping with the portrayed character".

Golynets also noted that the figure of the writer is turned from left to right, but the turn of the face and the gaze are opposite to this movement, and the compositional axis of the painting is shifted to the left. At the same time, the black stripe on the right "centers the position of the face on the green section of the drapery. In her opinion, all the lines converge on the face: the lapels of the coat, the clasp of the military jacket. Malyutin has emphasized the writer's head. The plasticity of its relief is particularly striking in comparison with the emptiness of the background and the flatness of the figure. Valentina Knyazeva noted that the minor details of the portrait (overcoat, bag, sheets of blank paper) are deliberately painted in a more free manner, so as not to distract the viewer's attention from the writer's face.

=== Coloring ===
The coloring of the portrait is simple and modest. Russian art historian Galina Elshevskaya explained it with the asceticism of the first post-revolutionary years. Elena Petinova emphasized the portrait's almost monochrome color scheme. According to Zinger, the colors are close to reality. The color scheme is dominated by calm dark green, ochre and grayish tones. Brighter colors emphasize "the inner glow of the sitter's radiant eyes and the scarlet stain of the Order. Light shadows (on the cheek, neck, ear, chin, accentuated forehead) simultaneously give relief to the face, emphasize the inner expressiveness of the picture and its psychological depth. Golynets also noted a spot of scarlet ribbon with the Order of the Red Banner against a background of "protective colors: ochre, gray and green".

The texture of the canvas appears smooth and light, almost transparent. In fact, it is dense, pasty and rough in places. The unity of the apparent and the real is in keeping with the complexity and versatility of the hero's image, increasing the emotional intensity of the portrait. Unlike Malyutin's pre-revolutionary works, which were mostly done in pastel, the portrait was painted in oil, which Zinger associated with the historical significance of the hero's image, which required a more stable and durable layer of paint.

== Second portrait of Furmanov — variant or study ==
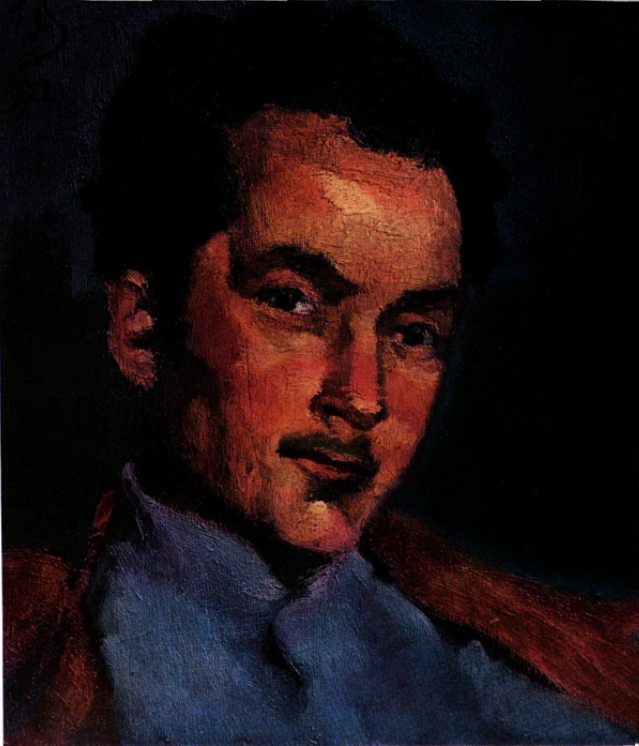
Sergei Malyutin. Portrait of D. A. Furmanov (variant or sketch), 1922

There exists another portrait of the writer painted by Malyutin—a lesser-known work by the artist. This is a bust-length portrait of the writer, also executed in oil, but on a small piece of plywood. This portrait is currently held in the manuscript department of the Maxim Gorky Literature Institute (in 1952, it was located in the Gorky Museum in Moscow). For a long time, it was considered a study for the larger portrait of the writer. This was how it was perceived by Dmitry Sarabyanov, the author of a monograph on Malyutin's work. He noted softness, fragility, and a lack of strength and confidence in Furmanov's face in this study. In his opinion, the artist retained the model's pose but altered the interpretation, revealing in the final version the writer's humanism, simplicity, warmth, inner will, strength, and determination.

In a conversation with Zinger, the artist's daughter, O. S. Malyutina, stated that the lesser-known portrait of Furmanov was actually created later, not from life, but based on the already completed main portrait. Zinger quoted O. S. Malyutina in his book: "Sergey Vasilyevich usually did not paint studies for portraits".

The lesser-known portrait is signed. It is dated to 1922. According to O. S. Malyutina's recollections, the artist created it when the larger portrait was still on the easel, that is, immediately after the final (fifth) session. Zinger speculated on possible reasons for the creation of the second portrait. In his view, the artist might have been dissatisfied with the main portrait (in particular, it is known that he was unhappy with the depiction of the hands — absent in the smaller image). Another possibility is that the artist made a copy. The artist's daughter recalled that the smaller portrait was given to the writer — "as a sign of sincere affection and gratitude for his help in the work". A third hypothesis is that the artist wanted to create a different version of the portrait. If the first portrait, according to Zinger, provides a multifaceted representation of Furmanov, combining various qualities of his character, the second focuses the viewer's attention on singular traits — softness, warmth, and heartfelt kindness. It is dominated by a state of dreamy contemplation. The model's fragility is noticeably evident. The colors are also altered with some use of glazing, an enhanced pinkish tone in the carnation, and, to balance it, Malyutin introduced pink paint into the depiction of the gray fabric of the greatcoat, lightened the background, and made the contours of the figure's silhouette more blurred. The lines of the face are less sharp than in the better-known portrait. Dmitry Shelestov also considered this portrait an independent work by the artist, noting its intimacy and lyricism.

== Replicas ==
External image
- Replica of the Portrait
- Efim Cheptsov. Meeting of the Village Cell, 1924

Zinger noted the influence of Malyutin's canvas on the portrait of Sergo Ordzhonikidze, painted by Evgeny Lansere in 1923. Lansere used the same accessories and composition, but, according to the art historian, despite the emotional intensity, he fell short of Malyutin in psychological depth. Zinger also remarked that the depiction of a young man in the background of the painting Meeting of the Village Cell by Efim Cheptsov (1924, this character has a real prototype — the leader of rural Komsomol members G. A. Sukhomlinov) is remarkably close to Malyutin's painting.

== Bibliography ==
- Abramova, А. V. (1978). "Продолжение галереи портретов (1917—1924). АХРР". Жизнь художника Сергея Малютина [Life of the artist Sergei Malyutin] (in Russian). М.: Изобразительное искусство. pp. 207–235.
- Abramova, А. V. (1952). Сергей Васильевич Малютин. 1959—1937 [Sergey Vasilievich Malyutin. 1959—1937]. М.: Искусство.
- Berezhnoy, А. F. (1955). "Снова в Москве". Фурманов-журналист [Furmanov the journalist] (in Russian). Л.: Ленинградское газетно-журнальное и книжное издательство. pp. 120–148.
- Bolshakova, L. A. (1976). Государственная Третьяковская галерея. Краткий путеводитель [State Tretyakov Gallery. A short guide] (in Russian). М.: Изобразительное искусство. p. 164.
- Golynets, G. V. (1987). С. Малютин. Избранные произведения. Альбом [S. Malyutin. Selected works. Album.] (in Russian). М.: Советский художник.
- Golynets, G. V. (1974). С. В. Малютин [S. V. Malyutin]. Массовая библиотечка по искусству (in Russian). Л.: Художник РСФСР. p. 51.
- Elshevskaya, G. V. (1984). Модель и образ. Концепция личности в русском и советском живописном портрете [Model and Image. The Concept of Personality in Russian and Soviet Pictorial Portraiture] (in Russian). М.: Советский художник. p. 216.
- Zinger, L. S. (1978). "Новый герой — новые нормы портрета". Советская портретная живопись 1917 — начала 30-х годов [Soviet portrait painting of 1917 - early 30s] (in Russian). М.: Искусство. pp. 43–126.
- Zinger, L. S. (1972). Новое о портрете Д. А. Фурманова работы С. В. Малютина [New about the portrait of D. A. Furmanov by S. V. Malyutin] (in Russian). Искусство: Журнал. pp. 30–33.
- Ilyushin, I. S. (1953). В. Малютин [S. Milyutin] (in Russian). М.: Государственная Третьяковская галерея. p. 52.
- Kalnberzina, А. M. (1953). Дмитрий Андреевич Фурманов. Критико-биографический очерк [Dmitry Andreyevich Furmanov. Critical and biographical sketch] (in Russian). Рига: Латгосиздат.
- Knyazeva, V. P. (1973). Ассоциация художников революционной России [Association of Artists of Revolutionary Russia] (in Russian). pp. 33–63, 334–420.
- Knyazeva, V. P. (1967). Ассоциация художников революционной России [Association of Artists of Revolutionary Russia] (in Russian). Л.: Художник РСФСР. p. 88.
- Kupriyanovsky, P. V. (1967). "Снова в Москве". Искания, борьба, творчество [Seekings, struggling, creating] (in Russian). Ярославль: Верхне-Волжское книжное издательство. pp. 319–431.
- Lebedyansky, M. S. (1977). Советская русская живопись первого октябрьского десятилетия [Soviet Russian painting of the first October decade] (in Russian). Л.: Художник РСФСР. p. 242.
- "Малютин Сергей Васильевич". Государственная Третьяковская галерея [State Tretyakov Gallery] (in Russian). Vol. 5. Живопись конца XIX – начала XX века. М.: СканРус. 2005. p. 528. ISBN 5-93221-089-3.
- Milotvorskaya, M. B. (1964). "Сергей Васильевич Малютин". Очерки по истории русского портрета конца XIX — начала XX века [Essays on the history of Russian portrait of the late XIX - early XX century] (in Russian). М.: Искусство: Коллективная монография. pp. 221–242.
- Naumov, E. I. (1951). Д. А. Фурманов. Критико-биографический очерк [D. A. Furmanov. Critical and biographical sketch] (in Russian). Л.: Государственное издательство художественной литературы.
- Ozerov, V. D. (1953). А. Фурманов. Критико-биографический очерк [А. Furmanov. Critical and biographical sketch] (in Russian). М.: Советский писатель.
- Petinova, E. F. (2006). "Сергей Васильевич Малютин". От академизма к модерну. Русская живопись конца XIX – начала XX века [From Academism to Art Nouveau. Russian painting of the late XIX - early XX century]. Школа искусства (in Russian). СПб.: Искусство — Санкт-Петербург. pp. 239–255. ISBN 5-210-01572-6.
- Radimov, P. A. (1973). "Сергей Васильевич Малютин". О родном и близком [About the familiar things and closeness] (in Russian). М.: Московский рабочий. pp. 84–89.
- Sarabyanov, D. V. (1952). Сергей Васильевич Малютин [Sergey Vasilievich Milyutin] (in Russian). М.: Советский художник.
- Sazonova, K. K. (1975). С. В. Малютин-портретист. Автореферат диссертации на соискание ученой степени кандидата искусствоведения [S. V. Malyutin-portraitist. Abstract of the dissertation for the degree of Candidate of Art History] (in Russian). Л.: Институт живописи, скульптуры и архитектуры имени И. Репина Академии художеств СССР. p. 17.
- Sopotsinsky, O. I. (1966). "Советское искусство. Живопись". Всеобщая история искусств в 6 томах [A General History of Art in 6 Volumes] (in Russian). Vol. 6. Book II. М.: Искусство. pp. 97–139.
- Satin, E. (1954). Зачётная книжка № 1605 [Student credit book #1605] (in Russian). Огонёк: Журнал. p. 24.
- Shelestov, D. K. (1973). В час вступления в литературу... [In the hour of introduction to literature...] (in Russian). Огонёк: Журнал. pp. 8–9.
- Государственная Третьяковская галерея. История и коллекции [State Tretyakov Gallery. History and collections] (in Russian). М.: Искусство. 1988. p. 448.
- Государственная Третьяковская галерея [State Tretyakov Gallery]. Государственная Третьяковская галерея: каталог собрания. Серия живопись XVIII – XX веков (in Russian). Vol. 6. Живопись первой половины XX века. Книга 2. К — Л. М.: СканРус. 2017. p. 488. ISBN 978-5-89580-185-7.
- Выставка произведений С. В. Малютина [Exhibition of works by S. V. Malyutin] (in Russian). М.: Всекохудожник. 1934.
