= Matryona =

Matryona or Matrena (Russian: Матрёна) is a Russian feminine given name derived from Latin matrona. Diminutive forms: Мотя, Мотря, Матрёха, Матрёша, Матрёшка, Маря, Матя, Матюля.

Notable people with the name include:

- Matryona Balk, Russian courtier
- Matrena Nogovitsyna (born 1991), Russian draughts player
- Matryona Necheporchukova (1924–2017), Russian combat medic in the Red Army
- Matrena Vakhrusheva, (1918–2000), Mansi linguist, philologist and writer
- Matryona Grigorievna Rasputina, birth name of Maria Rasputin, daughter of Grigori Rasputin known for several memoirs about her father

== See also ==
- Matrona (disambiguation)
- Matryoshka
