= Robert L. Causey =

American philosopher

Education
- Education: University of California, Berkeley (PhD), Caltech (BS)
- Thesis: Derived Measurement and the Foundations of Dimensional Analysis (1967)
- Doctoral advisor: Ernest Wilcox Adams

Philosophical work
- Era: 21st-century philosophy
- Region: Western philosophy
- Institutions: University of Texas at Austin
- Main interests: logic, philosophy of science
- Website: https://www.cs.utexas.edu/~rlc/

Robert L. Causey is an American philosopher and professor emeritus of Philosophy at the University of Texas at Austin. Causey is known for his works on logic and philosophy of science.

== Books ==
- Unity of Science (Synthese Library Volume 109). D. Reidel Publishing Co., Dordrecht and Boston, 1977. Now distributed by Springer Verlag
- Logic, Sets, and Recursion, Jones and Bartlett Pub., Boston, 1994, 2nd Edition 2006
