= Vasily Zvyozdochkin =

Russian wood carver and doll maker (1876–1956)

Vasily Petrovich Zvyozdochkin
- Василий Петрович Звёздочкин
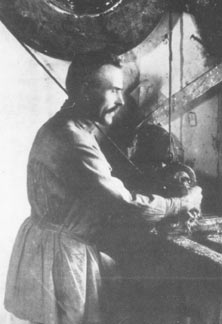
- Vasily Zvyozdochkin at work
- Born: 1876
- Died: 1956 (aged 79–80)
- Occupations: Woodturner, wood carver, doll maker, creator of Russian matryoshka doll

Vasily Petrovich Zvyozdochkin (Russian: Василий Петрович Звёздочкин; 1876–1956) was a Russian woodturner, wood carver and doll maker. He is credited with making the first Russian matryoshka doll (painted by Sergey Malyutin) in 1890.

Vasily Zvyozdochkin was born the eldest son in a peasant family in the village of Shubino, Voronovskaya volost.

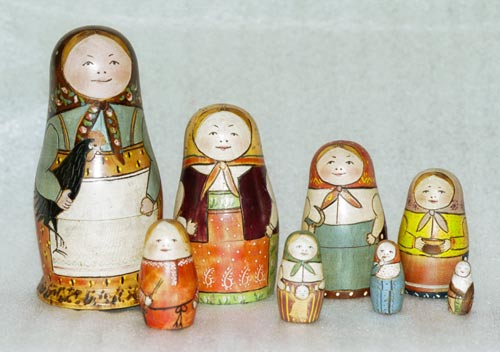
The original matryoshka by Zvyozdochkin and Malyutin
