= Matryoshka doll =

Russian nested wooden toy

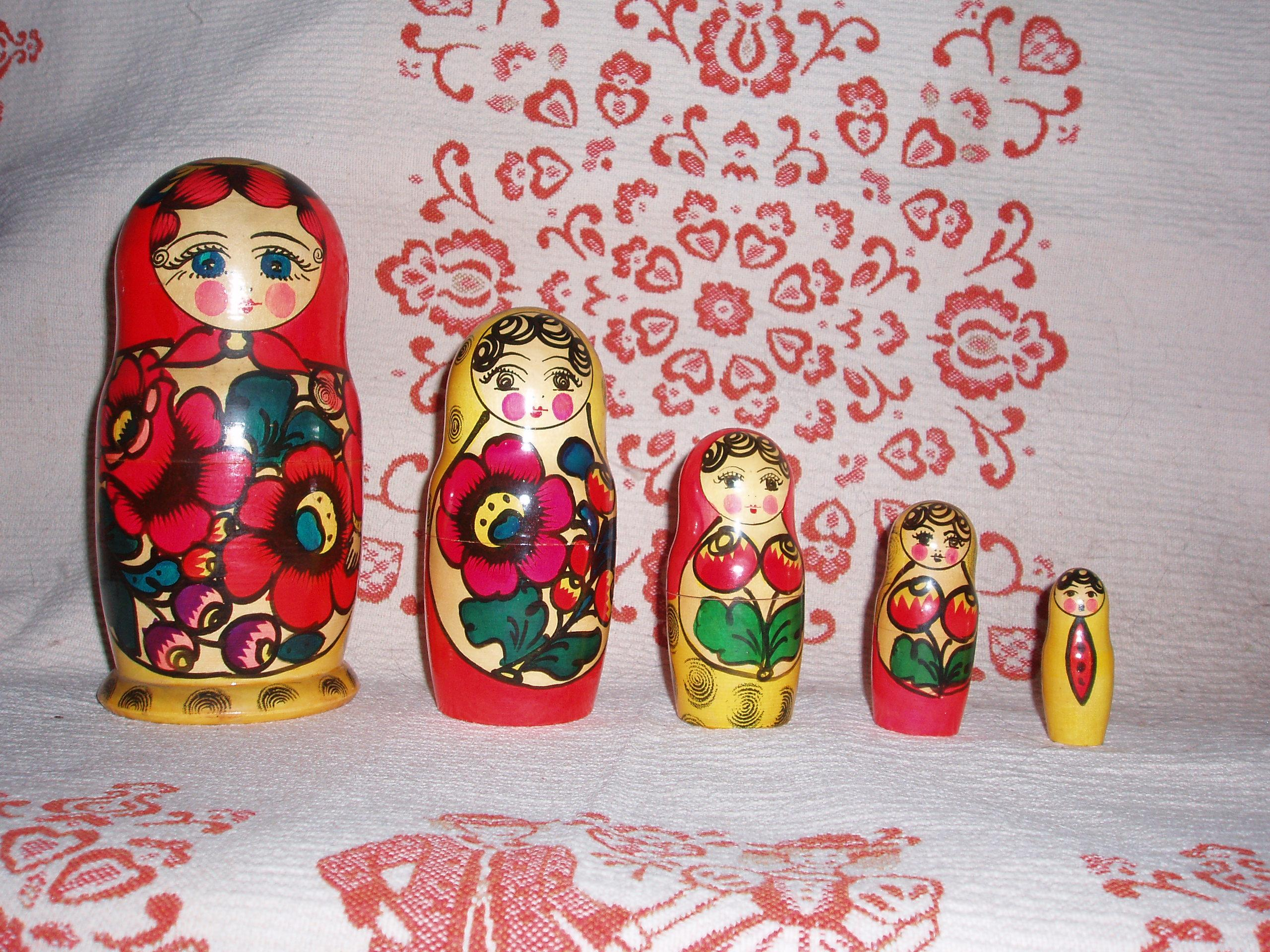
- Matryoshka dolls set in a row
- Other names: Russian doll
- Invented by: Vasily Zvyozdochkin (manufacturer); Sergey Malyutin (design)
- Country: Russia
- Availability: 1890s–present

A matryoshka doll or matryoshka (Note: Also transliterated as matreshka.) (/ˌmætriˈɒʃkə/; Russian: матрёшка), also known as a Russian stacking doll, nesting doll, or simply a Russian doll, is a set of wooden dolls of decreasing size placed one inside another. Matryoshka is a diminutive form of Matryosha (Матрёша), in turn an affectionate form of the Russian female first name Matryona (Матрёна).

A set of matryoshkas consists of a wooden figure, which separates at the middle, top from bottom, to reveal a smaller figure of the same sort inside, which has, in turn, another figure inside of it, and so on.

The first Russian nested doll set was made during the 1890s by woodturning craftsman and wood carver Vasily Zvyozdochkin from a design by Sergey Malyutin, who was a folk crafts painter at Abramtsevo. The dolls continue to be mass-produced to this day. Traditionally, the outer layer is a woman, dressed in a Russian sarafan dress. The figures inside may be of any gender; the smallest, innermost doll is typically a baby turned from a single piece of wood. Much of the artistry is in the painting of each doll, which can be very elaborate. The dolls often follow a theme; these themes vary from traditional forms, such as abstract Russian peasant beauties, to fairy tale characters as well as historical or political figures. In some countries, matryoshka dolls are often referred to as babushka dolls, though they are not known by this name in Russian; babushka (бабушка) means 'grandmother; old woman'.

== History ==
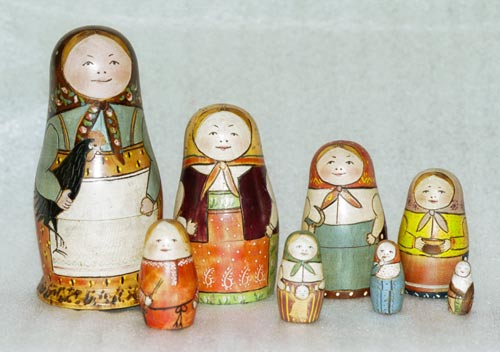
The original matryoshka set by Zvyozdochkin and Malyutin, 1892

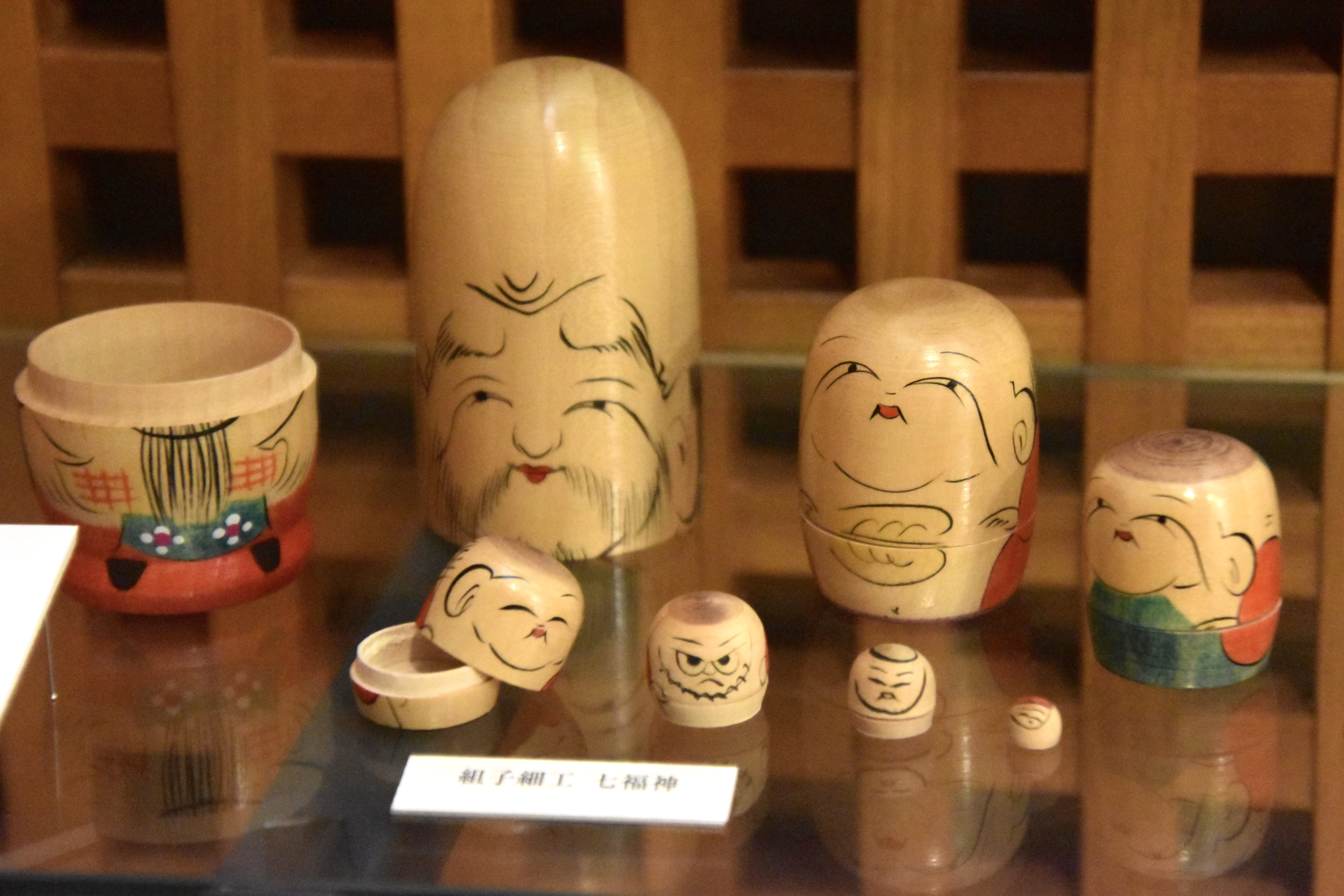
Seven Lucky Gods nesting dolls of Hakone, Kanagawa

The first Russian nested doll set was carved in 1890s at the Children's Education Workshop by Vasily Zvyozdochkin and designed by Sergey Malyutin, who was a folk crafts painter in the Abramtsevo estate of Savva Mamontov, a Russian industrialist and patron of arts. Mamontov's brother, Anatoly Ivanovich Mamontov (1839–1905), created the Children's Education Workshop to make and sell children's toys. The doll set was painted by Malyutin. Malyutin's doll set consisted of eight dolls—the outermost was a mother in a traditional dress holding a red-combed rooster. The inner dolls were her children, girls and a boy, and the innermost a baby. The Children's Education Workshop was closed in the late 1890s, but the tradition of the matryoshka simply relocated to Sergiyev Posad, the Russian city known as a toy-making center since the fourteenth century.

The inspiration for matryoshka dolls is not clear. There have been speculations that Matryoshka dolls may have been inspired by a nesting doll imported from Japan, however there are serious doubts. The Children's Education workshop where Zvyozdochkin was a lathe operator received a five-piece, cylinder-shaped nesting doll featuring Fukuruma (Fukurokuju) in the late 1890s, which is now part of the collection at the Sergiev Posad Museum of Toys. Other East Asian dolls share similarities with matryoshka dolls such as the Kokeshi dolls, originating in Northern Honshū, the main island of Japan, although they cannot be placed one inside another, and the round hollow daruma doll depicting a Buddhist monk. Another possible source of inspiration is the nesting Easter eggs produced on a lathe by Russian woodworkers during the late 19th Century.

Savva Mamontov's wife presented a set of matryoshka dolls at the Exposition Universelle in Paris in 1900, and the toy earned a bronze medal. Soon after, matryoshka dolls were being made in several places in Russia and shipped around the world.

== Manufacture ==
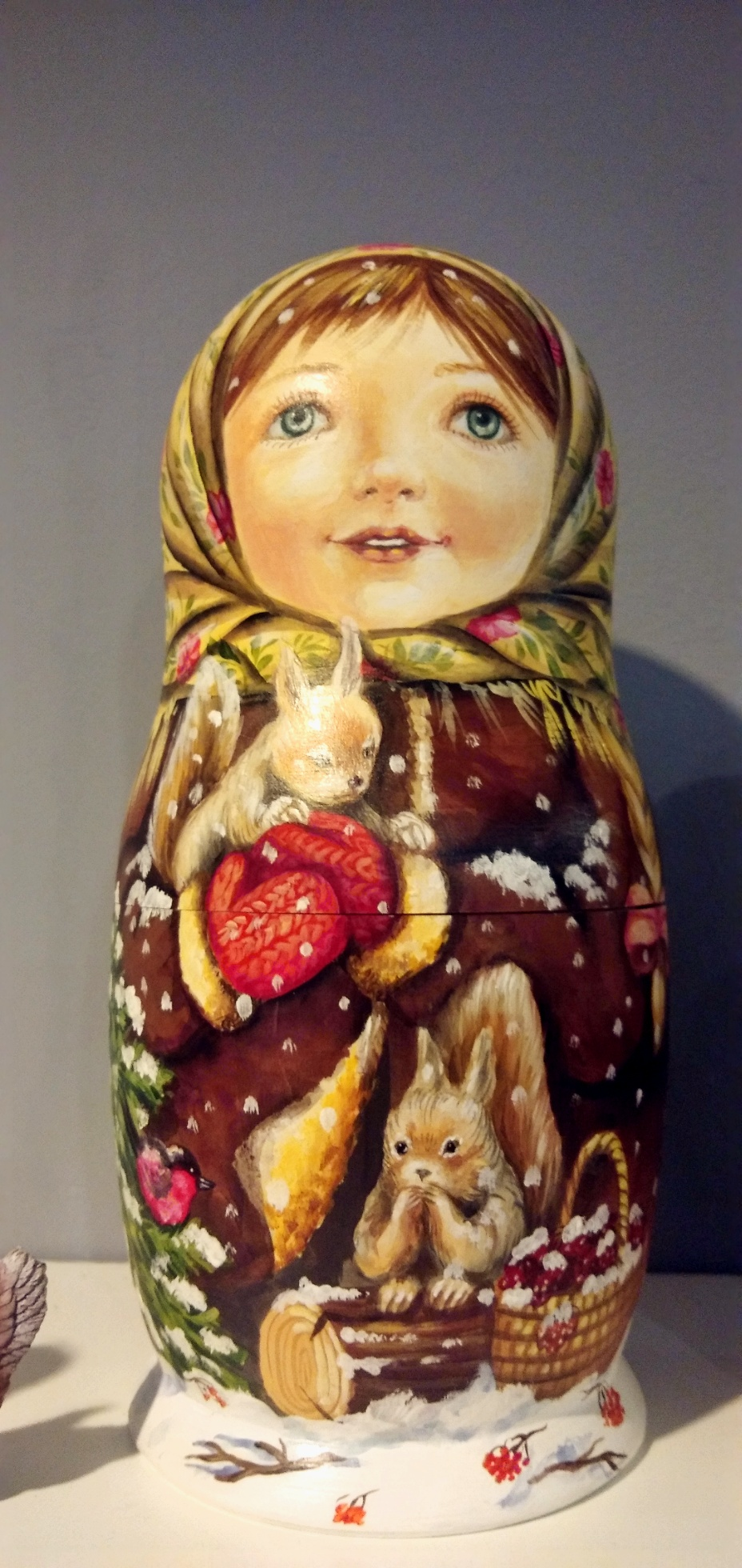
Russian doll (pictured in 2018)

=== Centers of production ===
The first matryoshka dolls were produced in the Children's Education (Detskoye vospitanie) workshop in Moscow. After it closed in 1904, production was transferred to the city of Sergiev Posad (Сергиев Посад), known as Sergiev (Сергиев) from 1919 to 1930 and Zagorsk from 1930 to 1991.

Matryoshka factories were later established in other cities and villages:

- the village of Polkhovsky Maidan (Полховский-Майдан), which is the primary producer of matryoshka blanks, and its neighboring villages Krutets (Крутец) and Gorodets (Городец)
- the city of Semenov, (Семёнов)
- the city of Kirov (Киров), known as Vyatka (Вя́тка) (from 1780 to 1934 and renamed Kirov in 1934 although many of its institutions reverted to the name Vyatka (Viatka) in 1991
- the city of Nolinsk (Нолинск)
- the city of Yoshkar-Ola (Йошкар-Ола) in the Republic of Mari-El

Following the collapse of the Soviet Union, the closure of many matryoshka factories, and the loosening of restrictions, independent artists began to produce matryoshka dolls in homes and art studios.

=== Method ===
Ordinarily, matryoshka dolls are crafted from linden wood. There is a popular misconception that they are carved from one piece of wood. Rather, they are produced using a lathe equipped with a balance bar, four heavy 2 foot (0.61 m) long distinct types of chisels (hook, knife, pipe, and spoon), and a set of handmade wooden calipers particular to a size of the doll. The tools are hand-forged by a blacksmith, traditionally from car axles or other salvage. A wood carver uniquely crafts each set of wooden calipers. Multiple pieces of wood are meticulously carved into the nesting set.

=== Shape, size, and pieces per set ===
The standard shape approximates a human silhouette with a flared base on the largest doll for stability. Other shapes include potbelly, cone, bell, egg, bottle, sphere, and cylinder.

The size and number of pieces vary widely. The industry standard from the Soviet period, which accounts for approximately 50% of all matryoshka produced, is six inches tall and consists of 5 dolls except for matryoshka dolls manufactured in Semenov, whose standard is five inches tall and consisting of 6 pieces. Other common sets are the 3-piece, the 7-piece, and the 10-piece.

=== Common characteristics ===
Matryoshka dolls painted in the traditional style share common elements. They depict female figures wearing a peasant dress (sarafan) and scarf or shawl usually with an apron and flowers. Each successively smaller doll is identical or nearly so. Distinctive regional styles developed in different areas of matryoshka manufacturing.

== Themes in dolls ==
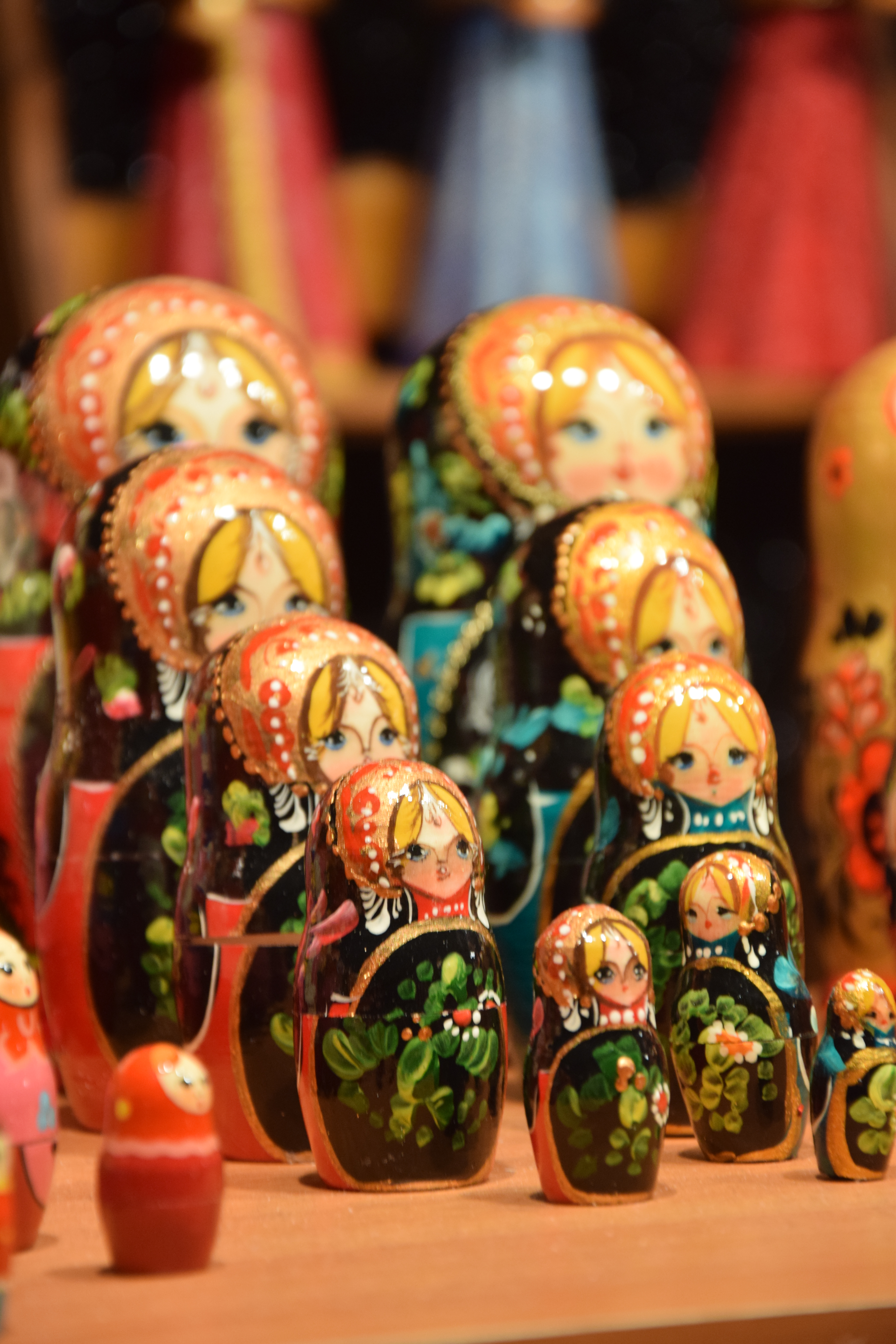
Alsatian matryoshka dolls

Matryoshka dolls are often designed to follow a particular theme; for instance, peasant girls in traditional dress. Originally, themes were often drawn from tradition or fairy tale characters, in keeping with the craft tradition—but since the late 20th century, they have embraced a larger range, including Russian leaders and popular culture.

Common themes of matryoshkas are floral and relate to nature. Often Christmas, Easter, and religion are used as themes for the doll. Modern artists create many new styles of nesting dolls, mostly as an alternative purchase option for tourism. These include animal collections, portraits, and caricatures of famous politicians, musicians, athletes, astronauts, "robots", and popular movie stars. Today, some Russian artists specialize in painting themed matryoshka dolls that feature specific categories of subjects, people, or nature. Areas with notable matryoshka styles include Sergiyev Posad, Semionovo (now the town of Semyonov), Polkhovsky Maydan, and the city of Kirov.

== Matryoshka records ==
The largest set of matryoshka dolls in the Guinness World Records is a 51-piece set hand-painted by Youlia Bereznitskaia (Russian: Юлия Березницкая) of Russia, completed in 2003. The tallest doll in the set measures 53.97 centimetres (21.25 in); the smallest, 0.31 centimetres (0.12 in). Arranged side-by-side, the dolls span 3.41 metres (11 ft 2.25 in). However, several larger sets are known.

In 1906, at the 1906 Milan International exposition, a matryoshka doll won a gold medal.

The largest collection of matryoshkas in the United States is in the Museum of Russian Art (Minnesota), which keeps about 3,500 matryoshkas.

== As metaphor ==
=== Nesting and onion metaphors ===
Examples of metaphorical use of matryoshka include the matrioshka brain, the Matroska media-container format, and the Russian Doll model of multi-walled carbon nanotubes.

The onion metaphor is similar. If the outer layer is peeled off an onion, a similar onion exists within. This structure is employed by designers in applications such as the layering of clothes or the design of tables, where a smaller table nests within a larger table, and a smaller one within that.

The metaphor of the matryoshka doll (or its onion equivalent) is also used in the description of shell companies and similar corporate structures that are used in the context of tax-evasion schemes in low-tax jurisdictions (for example, offshore tax havens).

=== Other metaphors ===
Matryoshka is often seen as a symbol of the feminine side of Russian culture. Matryoshka is associated in Russia with family and fertility. Matryoshka is used as the symbol for the epithet Mother Russia. Matryoshka dolls are a traditional representation of the mother carrying a child within her and can be seen as a representation of a chain of mothers carrying on the family legacy through the child in their wombs. Furthermore, matryoshka dolls are used to illustrate the unity of body, soul, mind, heart, and spirit.

== As an emoji ==
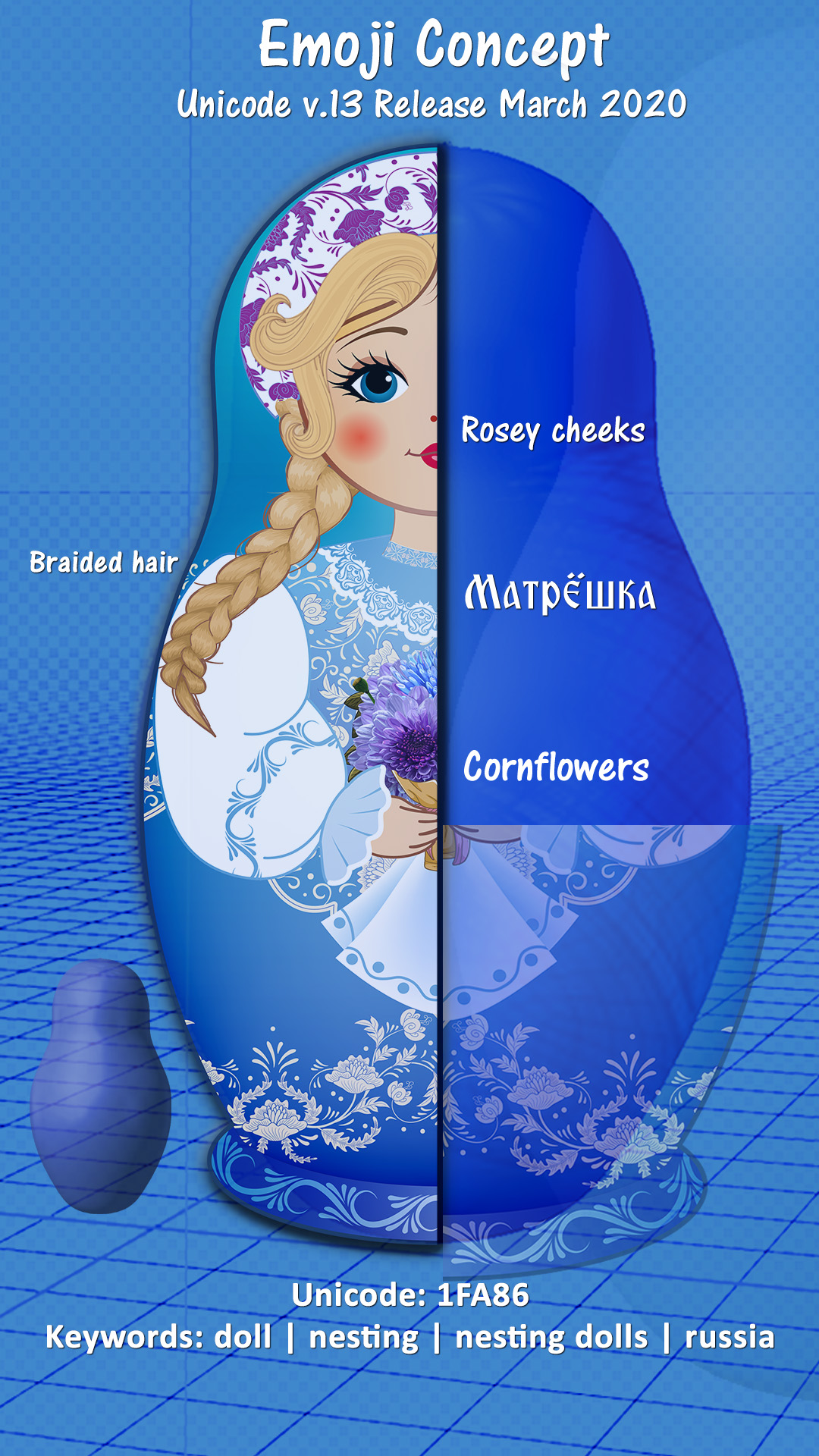
Original emoji concept as submitted to the Unicode Consortium by Jef Gray

In 2020, the Unicode Consortium approved the matryoshka doll as one of the new emoji characters in release v.13. The matryoshka or nesting doll emoji was submitted to the consortium by Jef Gray and Samantha Sunne, as a non-religious, apolitical symbol of Russian-East European-Far East Asian culture.

== Gallery ==
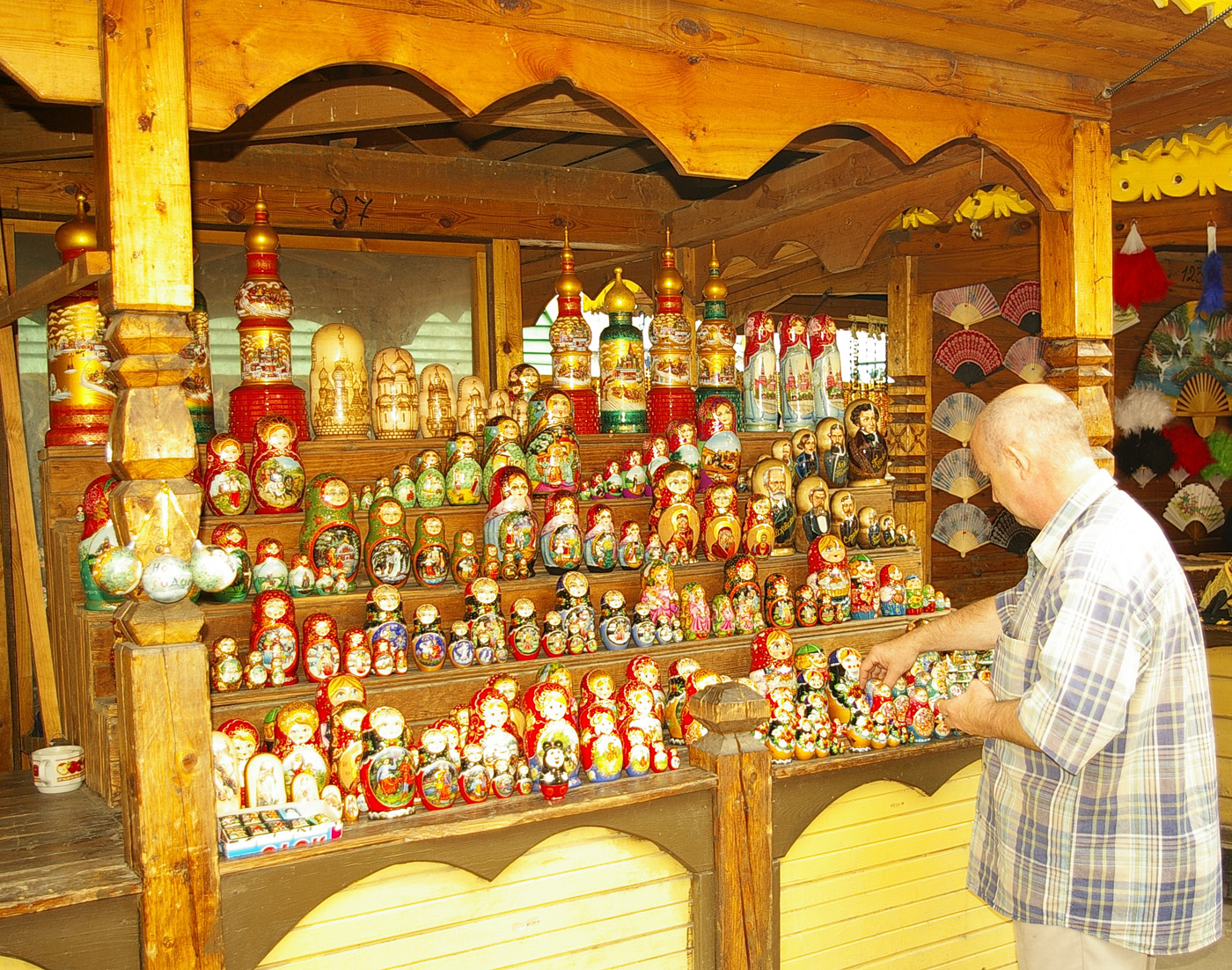
The Izmaylovo market in Moscow with matryoshka dolls

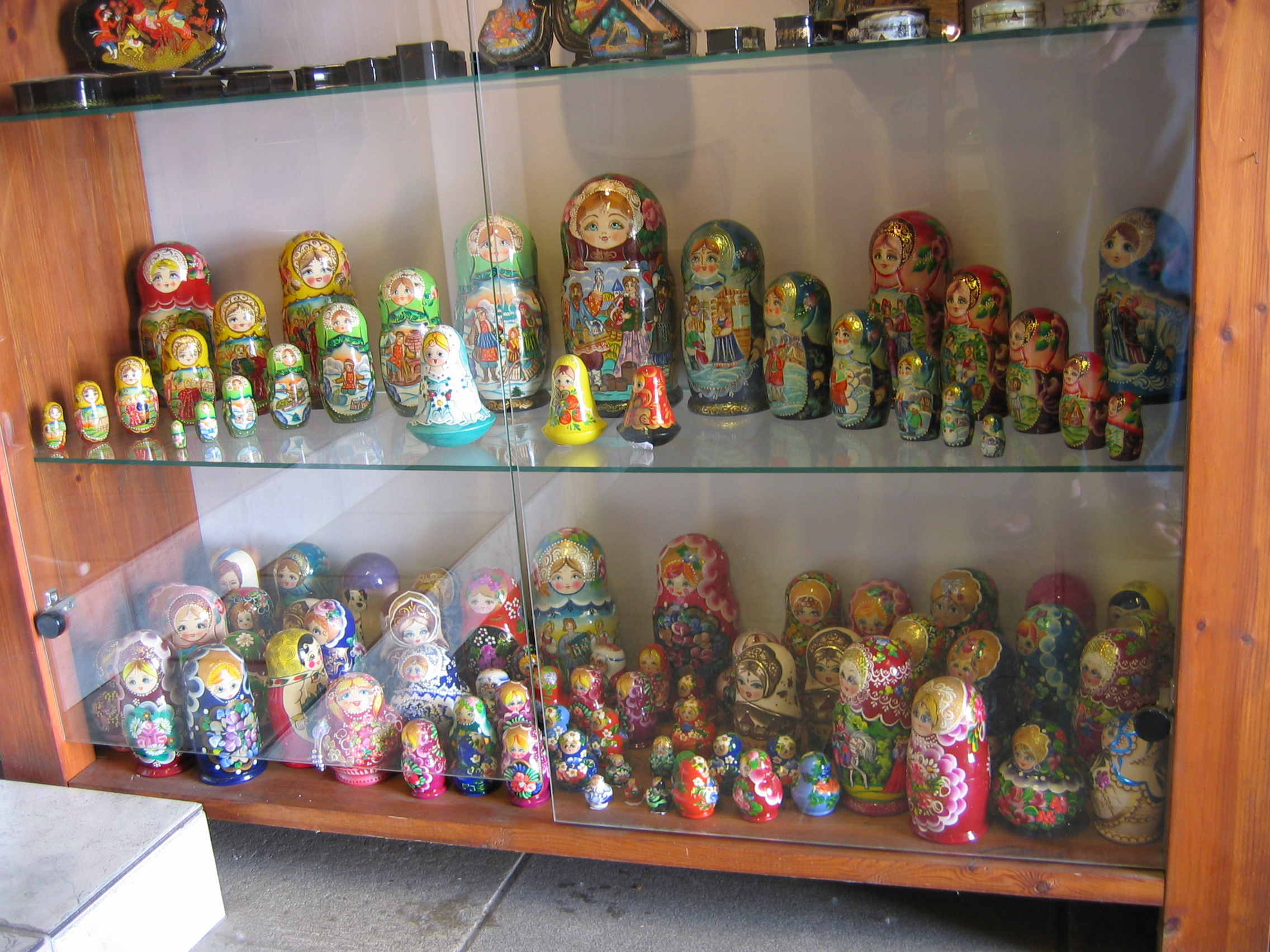
Matryoshka dolls in Tallinn, Estonia

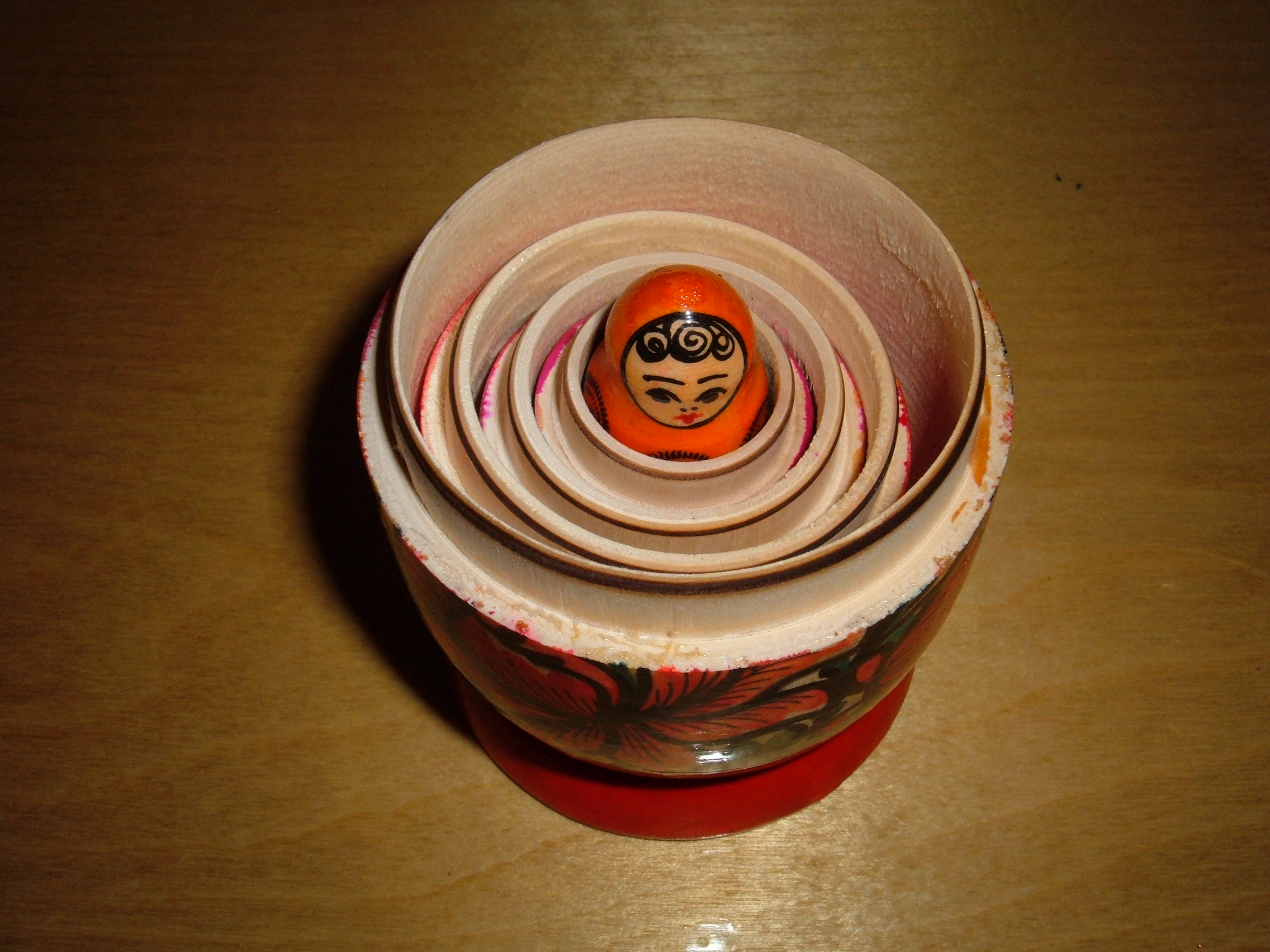
Nesting of opened matryoshkas

== See also ==
- Chinese boxes
- Droste effect
- Fractal
- Mise en abyme
- Self-similarity
- Shaker-style pantry box
- Stacking (video game)
- Turducken
- Turtles all the way down

== Sources ==
- Baljeu, Janet (2012). Downloading Spirit: Babushka. Xlibris. ISBN 978-1-4691-5764-1. OCLC 934717840.
- Billington, James H. (2004). Russia in search of itself. Woodrow Wilson Center Press. ISBN 978-0-8018-7976-0.
- Ertl, Rett (2003). The Art of the Russian Matryoshka. Boulder, CO, USA: Vernissage Press, LLC. ISBN 0-9725027-1-8.
- Harkness, Kristen M. (2007). "Folk art". In Smorodinskaya, Tatiana; Evans-Romaine, Karen; Goscilo, Helena (eds.). Encyclopedia of Contemporary Russian Culture. Routledge. pp. 213–214. ISBN 978-0-415-32094-8.
- Holland, John (2007). Power of the Soul: Inside Wisdom for an Outside World (1st ed.). Carlsbad, CA: Hay House. p. 3. ISBN 978-1-4019-1085-3. OCLC 70836680.
- Hubbs, Joanna (1993) [1988]. Mother Russia: The Feminine Myth in Russian Culture (1st Midland Book ed.). Bloomington: Indiana University Press. ISBN 978-0-253-20842-2. OCLC 29539185.
- Shapiro, Rami (2012). Writing – The Sacred Art: Beyond the Page to Spiritual Practice. Shapiro, Aaron (Quality paperback ed.). Woodstock, VT: SkyLight Paths Pub. ISBN 978-1-59473-372-7. OCLC 767566167.
