= Sergey Malyutin =

Russian painter, designer, illustrator and architect

- Сергей Малютин
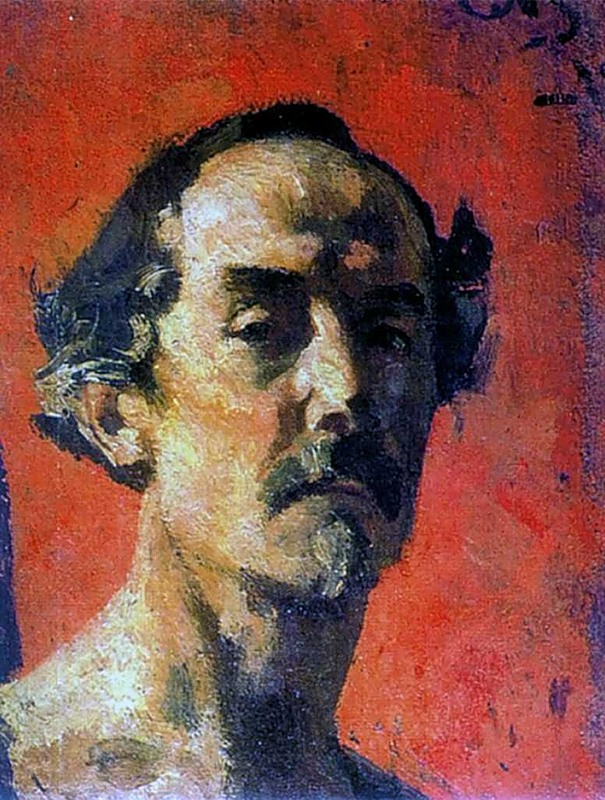
- Self-portrait (1918)
- Born: Sergey Vasilyevich Malyutin; October 4, 1859; Moscow, Russian Empire
- Died: December 6, 1937 (aged 78); Moscow, Russian SFSR, Soviet Union
- Known for: Painting, architecture
- Notable work: Matryoshka doll
- Movement: Arts and Crafts

Sergey Vasilyevich Malyutin (Russian: Сергей Васильевич Малютин; 4 October 1859 – 6 December 1937) was a Russian painter of fine crafts, (scenic) designer, illustrator and architect; initially associated with the Arts and Crafts Movement. Most of his oil paintings are portraits. Outside of Russia, he is perhaps best known for designing the first set of Matryoshka dolls, created by Vasily Zvyozdochkin in 1890.

== Biography ==
Malyutin was born in Moscow to a family of merchants in 1859 and was raised in Voronezh where, in 1870, an exhibition by the Peredvizhniki inspired him to become an artist. From 1883 to 1886, he attended the Moscow School of Painting, Sculpture and Architecture (MSPSA), where he studied with Illarion Pryanishnikov and Vladimir Makovsky. Upon graduating, he was awarded a silver medal. In 1890, he was named a "Free Artist".

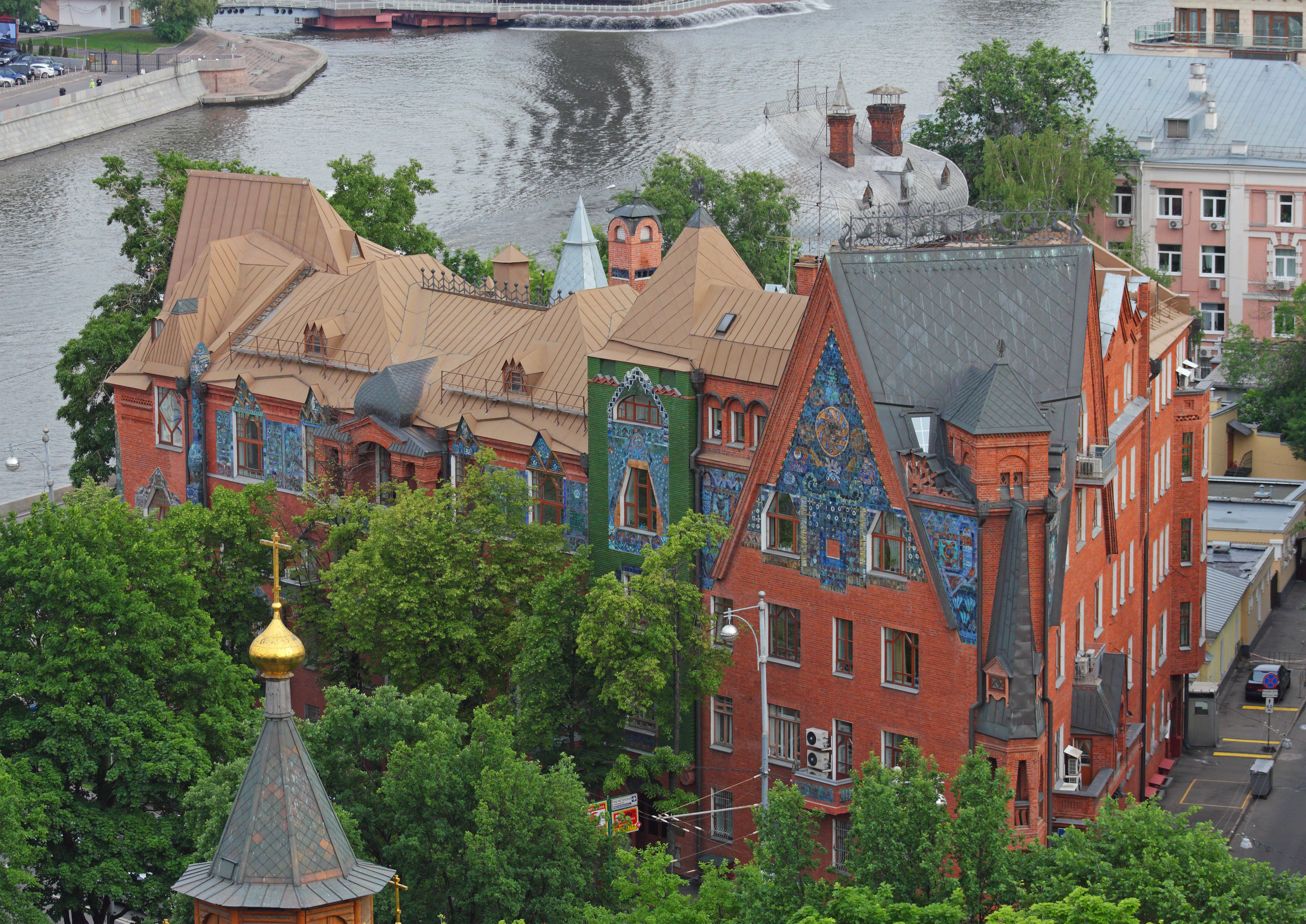
The Pertsov House

That same year, he was employed as a designer by the Private Opera of Savva Mamontov and, over the following decade and a half, would create sets for numerous operas and ballets, including the Nutcracker at the Mariinsky Theater.

From 1891 to 1893, he was an instructor at the Elizabethan Institute and became a member of the Moscow Art Society in 1896. During this time, he also created illustrations for the works of Pushkin and some Russian folk tales.

In 1900, he went to the art colony in Talashkino, near Smolensk, where he was involved in the ceramic and carving workshops of Princess Maria Tenisheva and joined the movement known as "Mir Iskusstva". While there, he designed a building for the school library (named "Teremok", after a Russian folktale) and decorated the theater. He remained there until 1903. His designs for a church were later realized by the architect Vladimir Suslov. Later, he would work with Nikolai Zhukov to create the "Pertsov House" in Moscow. His architectural designs were basically part of the Russian Revival movement, but were also embellished with fantastic folk motifs.

From 1903 to 1917, he taught at the MSPSA. During that time, he joined the Peredvizhniki (1913) and was named an "Academician" by the Imperial Academy of Arts (1914). After the 1917 Revolution, he worked as an instructor at the "Higher Artistic and Technical Workshops" known as Vkhutemas ("ВХУТЕМАС"); a school established by Vladimir Lenin. He was there until 1923. From 1918 to 1921, he also participated in the creation of the propaganda posters known as "Rosta Windows". In 1922, he was one of the co-founders of the Association of Artists of Revolutionary Russia, which held its first meeting at his home, and became an advocate for Socialist Realism.

He died in Moscow in 1937 at the age of 79.

== Selected works ==
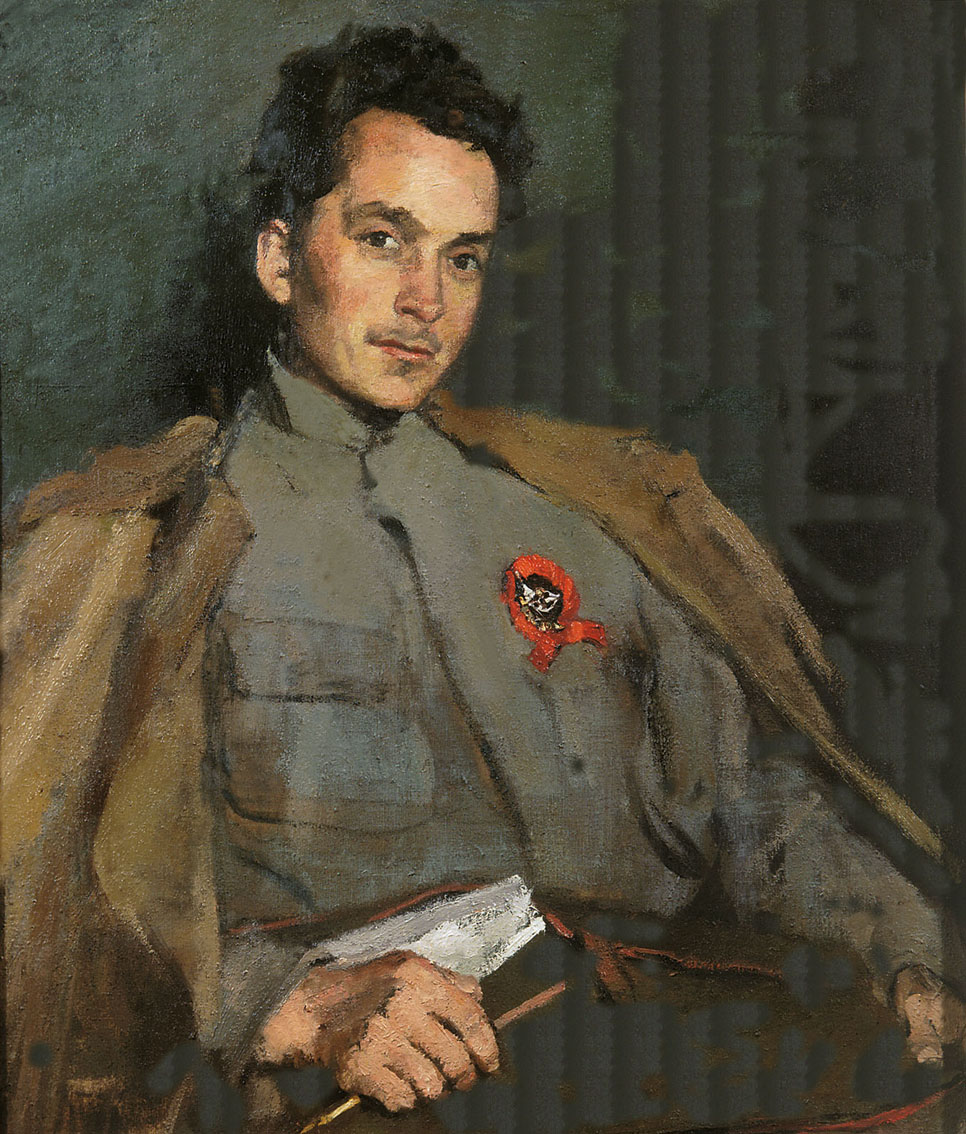
Dmitry Furmanov

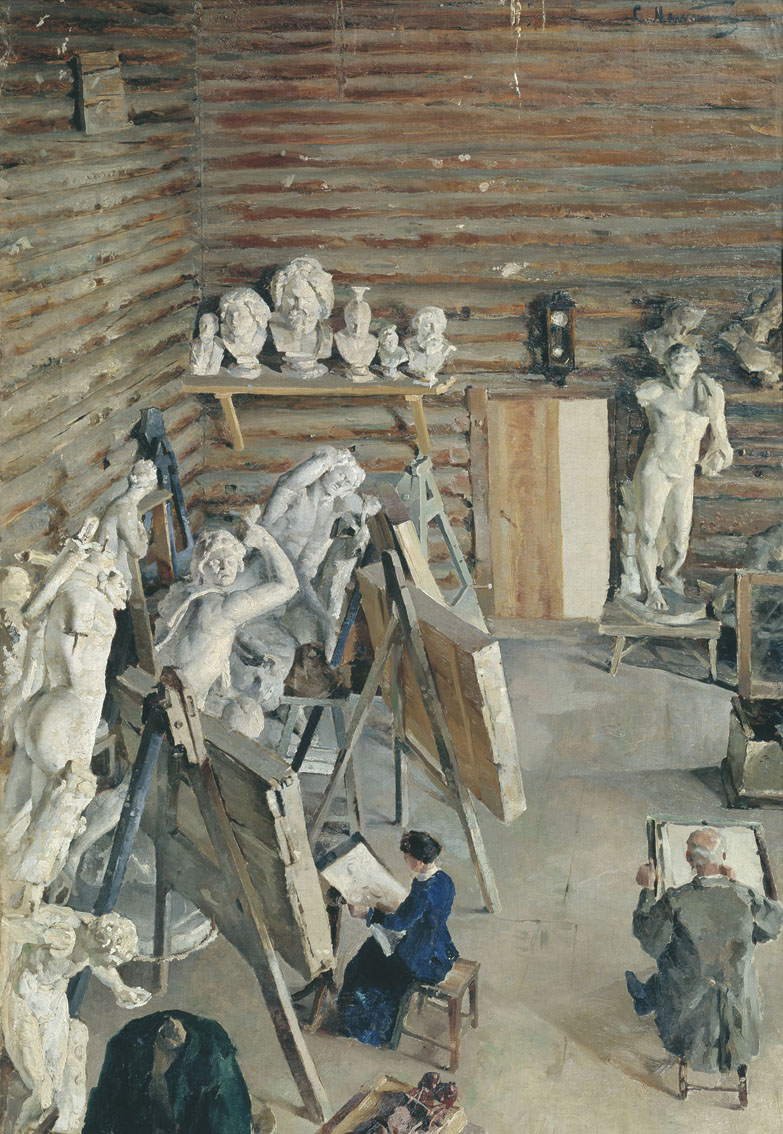
A Sculptor's Studio

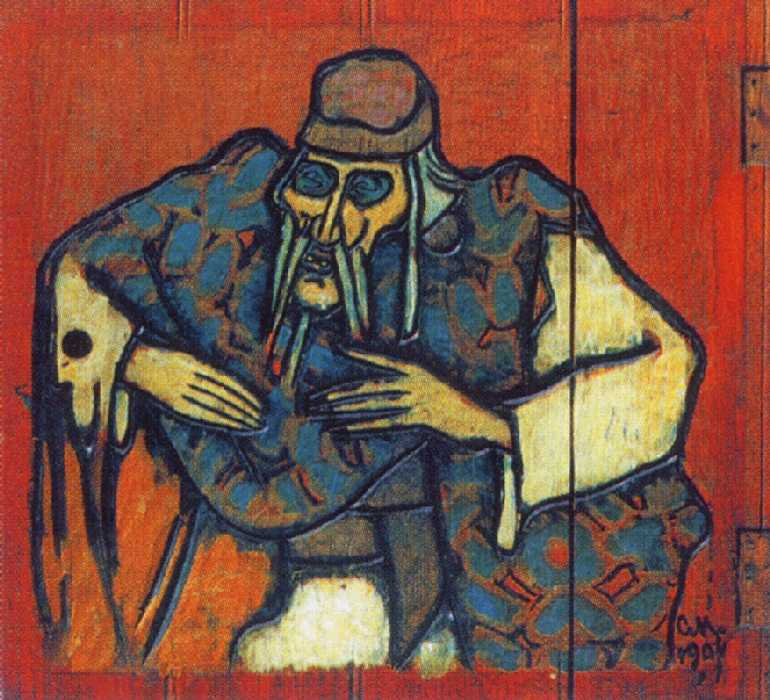
Koschei, the Deathless

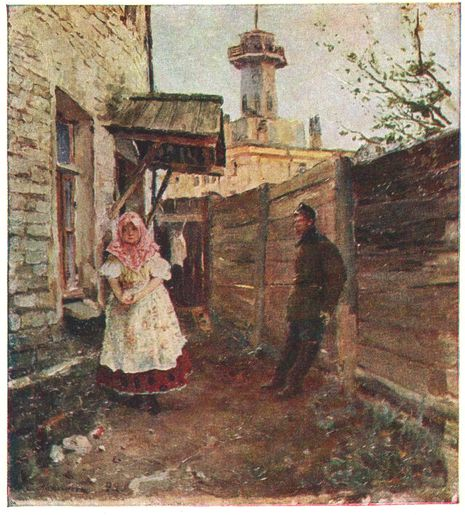
Visiting the Neighbours

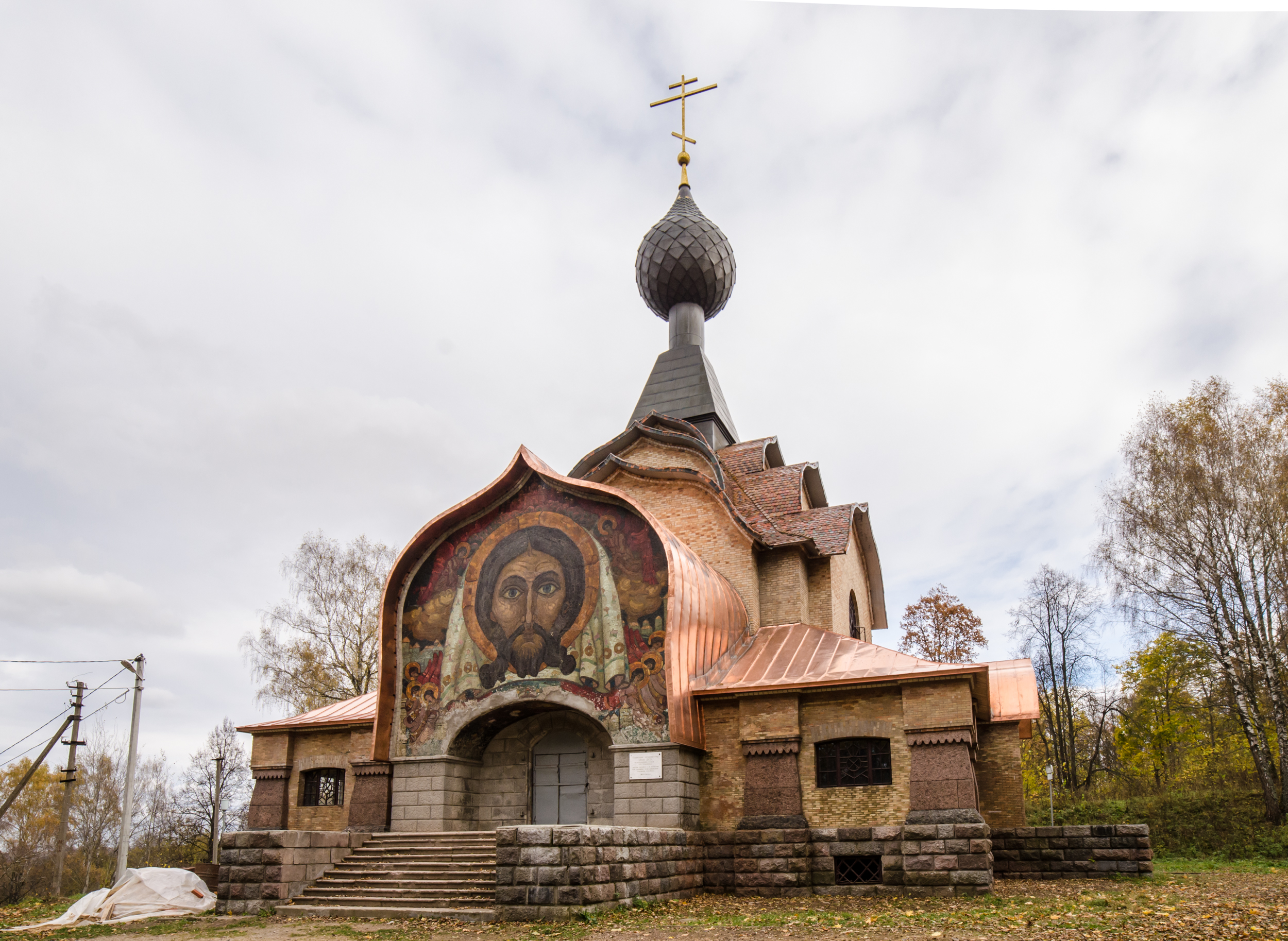
The Church of the Holy Spirit in Talashkino, 1903–05.

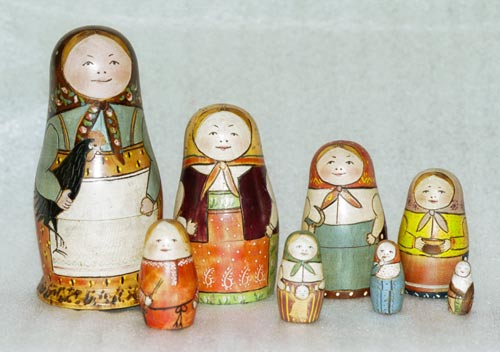
The first matryoshka doll set, 1890 — carved by Zvyozdochkin, painted by Malyutin
