= Matrona =

Matrona may refer to:

== Given name ==
- Matrona of Barcelona, a saint of the Roman Catholic Church, born in Thessaloniki and venerated in Barcelona
- Matrona the Barefoot, a saint of the Russian Orthodox Church
- Matrona of Chios, also known as Chiopolitissa, a 15th-century saint of the Orthodox Church, born in the island of Chios, Greece
- Matrona of Perge, a fifth-century saint of the Byzantine Church, born in the city of Perge Pamphylia (Asia Minor)
- Matrona Nikonova, known as Matrona of Moscow, a saint of the Russian Orthodox Church

== Other ==
- Dea Matrona, a singular form of Matronae or Matrones, mother goddesses attested in the Roman era among Celtic and Germanic regions
- Matres and Matronae, female deities
- Matrona, Latin name of the river Marne, France
- Matrona (damselfly), a genus of damselflies in the family Calopterygidae
- Matrona, a story arc of the Philippine comic strip series Pugad Baboy
- Pedro Matrona (1927–2019), Curaçaoan footballer
- MV Matrona (1918), a cargo liner which capsized in 1947 and was scrapped in 1948

== See also ==
- Matryona
