= Matron Stakes =

Matron Stakes may refer to:

- Matron Stakes, the registered title of the Schweppervescence Trophy, a horse race held at Flemington Racecourse in Australia
- Matron Stakes (Ireland), a horse race held at Leopardstown Racecourse in Ireland
- Matron Stakes (NYRA), a New York Racing Association horse race currently held at Belmont Park, New York, in the United States
- Arlington Matron Stakes, a horse race held at Arlington Park, Illinois, in the United States
- Ontario Matron Stakes, a horse race held at Woodbine Park, Ontario, in Canada
